Operation Husky order of battle is a listing of the significant military and air force units that were involved in the campaign for Sicily, July 10 – August 17, 1943.

Allied forces
Allied Forces Headquarters - MediterraneanSupreme Commander: General Dwight D. Eisenhower

Allied 15th Army Group
The Allied 15th Army Group was under the command of General Sir Harold Alexander.
 U.S. 9th Infantry DivisionCommanded by Major General Manton S. Eddy.
 39th Infantry Regiment
 47th Infantry Regiment
 60th Infantry Regiment
 26th Field Artillery Battalion
 34th Field Artillery Battalion
 60th Field Artillery Battalion
 84th Field Artillery Battalion
 15th Engineer Combat Battalion
 42nd Anti-Aircraft Battalion
 9th Reconnaissance Troop
 U.S. 82nd Airborne Division Commanded by Major General Matthew Ridgway. The independent 509th Parachute Infantry Battalion was held in reserve and it never saw action.
 504th Parachute Infantry Regiment
 505th Parachute Infantry Regiment
 325th Glider Infantry Regiment
 376th Parachute Field Artillery Battalion
 456th Parachute Field Artillery Battalion
 319th Glider Field Artillery Battalion
 320th Glider Field Artillery Battalion
 307th Airborne Engineer Battalion
 80th Airborne Anti-Aircraft Battalion
 46th British Infantry Division Commanded by Major General H. A. Freeman-Attwood.
 128th Infantry Brigade
 138th Infantry Brigade
 139th Infantry Brigade
 46th Royal Artillery Brigade
 46th Royal Engineer Brigade

U.S. Seventh Army
 
The U.S. Seventh Army was commanded by Lieutenant General George S. Patton.
 1st Ranger Battalion
 3rd Ranger Battalion
 4th Ranger Battalion
 70th Tank Battalion
 753rd Tank Battalion
 601st Tank Destroyer Battalion
 813th Tank Destroyer Battalion - two platoons
 39th Engineer Regiment
 540th Engineer Shore Regiment
 5th Armored Artillery Group
 58th Armored Field Artillery Battalion
 62nd Armored Field Artillery Battalion
 65th Armored Field Artillery Battalion
 17th Artillery Regiment
 36th Artillery Regiment
 77th Artillery Regiment
 178th Artillery Regiment
 Free French 4th Moroccan Tabor

U.S. II Corps
The U.S. II Corps was commanded by Lieutenant General Omar Bradley.
 U.S. 1st Infantry DivisionFirst commanded by Major General Terry Allen He was replaced by Major General Clarence R. Huebner on August 7.
 16th Infantry Regiment
 18th Infantry Regiment
 26th Infantry Regiment
 5th Field Artillery Battalion
 7th Field Artillery Battalion
 32nd Field Artillery Battalion
 33rd Field Artillery Battalion
 1st Engineer Combat Battalion
 1st Reconnaissance Troop
 U.S. 45th Infantry DivisionCommanded by Major General Troy H. Middleton.
 157th Infantry Regiment
 179th Infantry Regiment
 180th Infantry Regiment
 158th Field Artillery Battalion
 160th Field Artillery Battalion
 171st Field Artillery Battalion
 189th Field Artillery Battalion
 645th Tank Destroyer Battalion
 120th Engineer Combat Battalion
 45th Reconnaissance Troop

U.S. Provisional Corps
(Headquarters activated on 15 July 1943)
Commanded by Major General Geoffrey Keyes.
 U.S. 2nd Armored DivisionCommanded by Major General Hugh Joseph Gaffey. Divisional units were placed under the combat commands as needed.
 Combat Command A
 Combat Command B
 41st Armored Infantry Regiment
 66th Armored Regiment
 67th Armored Regiment
 14th Armored Field Artillery Battalion
 78th Armored Field Artillery Battalion
 92nd Armored Field Artillery Battalion
 17th Armored Engineer Battalion
 82nd Armored Reconnaissance Battalion
 U.S. 3rd Infantry Division Commanded by Major General Lucian Truscott
 7th Infantry Regiment
 15th Infantry Regiment
 30th Infantry Regiment
 9th Field Artillery Battalion
 10th Field Artillery Battalion
 39th Field Artillery Battalion
 41st Field Artillery Battalion
 10th Engineer Combat Battalion

British Eighth Army

The British Eighth Army was under the command of General Sir Bernard Montgomery.
The British 46th Infantry Division formed a floating reserve, but it did not participate in the Sicily campaign.

Army Troops
 2nd Special Air Service
 No. 3 (Army) Commando
 No. 40 (Royal Marine) Commando
 No. 41 (Royal Marine) Commando
 Three companies of 2nd/7th Battalion, Middlesex Regiment
 2nd/4th Battalion, Hampshire Regiment
 1st Battalion, Argyll and Sutherland Highlanders
 2nd Battalion, Highland Light Infantry
 1st Battalion, Welch Regiment
 7th Battalion, Royal Marines

British XIII Corps
XIII Corps was commanded by Lieutenant-General Miles Dempsey.
 105th Anti-Tank Regiment, Royal Artillery
 6th Army Group Royal Artillery
 24th Field Regiment, Royal Artillery
 98th (Surrey & Sussex Yeomanry Queen Mary's) Field Regiment, Royal Artillery
 111th Field Regiment, Royal Artillery
 66th Medium Regiment, Royal Artillery
 75th (Shropshire Yeomanry) Medium Regiment, Royal Artillery
 80th (Scottish Horse Yeomanry) Medium Regiment, Royal Artillery
 XIII Corps Troops Royal Engineers
 56th Field Company, Royal Engineers
 576th Corps Field Park Company, Royal Engineers
 577th Army Field Company, Royal Engineers
 578th Army Field Company, Royal Engineers
 5th Infantry DivisionCommanded by Major-General Horatio Berney-Ficklin (succeeded by Major-General Gerard Bucknall on 3 August).
 13th Infantry Brigade
 2nd Battalion, Cameronians (Scottish Rifles)
 2nd Battalion, Royal Inniskilling Fusiliers
 2nd Battalion, Wiltshire Regiment
 15th Infantry Brigade
 1st Battalion, Green Howards
 1st Battalion, King's Own Yorkshire Light Infantry
 1st Battalion, York and Lancaster Regiment
 17th Infantry Brigade
 2nd Battalion, Royal Scots Fusiliers
 2nd Battalion, Northamptonshire Regiment
 6th Battalion, Seaforth Highlanders
 91st (4th London) Field Regiment, Royal Artillery
 92nd (5th London) Field Regiment, Royal Artillery
 156th (Lanarkshire Yeomanry) Field Regiment, Royal Artillery
 52nd (6th London) Anti-Tank Regiment, Royal Artillery
 18th Light Anti-Aircraft Regiment, Royal Artillery
 5th Reconnaissance Regiment, Reconnaissance Corps
 7th Battalion, Cheshire Regiment (machine gun battalion)
 5th Divisional Engineers
 38th Field Company, Royal Engineers
 245th Field Company, Royal Engineers
 252nd Field Company, Royal Engineers
 245th Field Park Company, Royal Engineers
 50th (Northumbrian) Infantry DivisionCommanded by Major-General Sidney Kirkman.
 69th Infantry Brigade
 5th Battalion, East Yorkshire Regiment
 6th Battalion, Green Howards
 7th Battalion, Green Howards
 151st Infantry Brigade
 6th Battalion, Durham Light Infantry
 8th Battalion, Durham Light Infantry
 9th Battalion, Durham Light Infantry
 168th (2nd London) Brigade
 1st Battalion, London Irish Rifles
 1st Battalion, London Scottish
 10th Battalion, Royal Berkshire Regiment
 74th Field Regiment, Royal Artillery
 90th (City of London) Field Regiment, Royal Artillery
 124th Field Regiment, Royal Artillery
 102nd (Northumberland Hussars) Anti-Tank Regiment, Royal Artillery
 25th Light Anti-Aircraft Regiment, Royal Artillery
 2nd Battalion, Cheshire Regiment (machine gun battalion)
 50th Divisional Engineers
 233rd (Northumbrian) Field Company, Royal Engineers
 501st (London) Field Company, Royal Engineers
 505th Field Company, Royal Engineers
 235th (Northumbrian) Field Park Company, Royal Engineers
 British 78th Infantry DivisionCommanded by Major-General Vyvyan Evelegh.
 11th Infantry Brigade
 2nd Battalion, Lancashire Fusiliers
 1st Battalion, East Surrey Regiment
 5th (Huntingdonshire) Battalion, Northamptonshire Regiment
 36th Infantry Brigade
 5th Battalion, Buffs (Royal East Kent Regiment)
 6th Battalion, Queen's Own Royal West Kent Regiment
 8th Battalion, Argyll and Sutherland Highlanders
 38th (Irish) Infantry Brigade
 6th Battalion, Royal Iniskilling Fusiliers
 1st Battalion, Royal Irish Fusiliers
 2nd Battalion, London Irish Rifles
 56th Reconnaissance Regiment, Reconnaissance Corps
 17th Field Regiment, Royal Artillery
 132nd (Welsh) Field Regiment, Royal Artillery
 138th (City of London) Field Regiment, Royal Artillery
 64th (Queen's Own Royal Glasgow Yeomanry) Anti-Tank Regiment, Royal Artillery
 49th Light Anti-Aircraft Regiment, Royal Artillery
 1st Battalion, Kensington Regiment (Princess Louise's) (machine gun)
 78th Divisional Engineers
 214th Field Company, Royal Engineers
 237th Field Company, Royal Engineers
 256th Field Company, Royal Engineers
 281st Field Park Company, Royal Engineers
 1st Airborne DivisionCommanded by Major-General George F. Hopkinson. This unit did not participate as a division.
 1st Airlanding Brigade
 1st Battalion, Border Regiment
 2nd Battalion, South Staffordshire Regiment
 9th Field Company, Royal Engineers
 1st Parachute Brigade
 1st Battalion, Parachute Regiment
 2nd Battalion, Parachute Regiment
 3rd Battalion, Parachute Regiment
 16th (Parachute) Field Ambulance
 1st Airlanding Anti-Tank Battery, Royal Artillery
 1st (Airborne) Divisional Provost, Corps of Military Police
 British 4th Armoured Brigade
 3rd County of London Yeomanry (Sharpshooters)
 44th Royal Tank Regiment
 A Squadron, 1st (Royal) Dragoons

British XXX Corps
XXX Corps was commanded by Lieutenant-General Sir Oliver Leese.
 73rd Anti-Tank Regiment, Royal Artillery
 5th Army Group Royal Artillery
 57th (Home Counties) Field Regiment, Royal Artillery
 58th (Sussex) Field Regiment, Royal Artillery
 78th (Lowland) Field Regiment, Royal Artillery
 7th Medium Regiment, Royal Artillery
 64th (London) Medium Regiment, Royal Artillery
 70th Medium Regiment, Royal Artillery
 11th Regiment, Royal Horse Artillery (Honourable Artillery Company)
 142nd (Royal Devon Yeomanry) Field Regiment, Royal Artillery
 1st Canadian Infantry DivisionCommanded by Major-General Guy Simonds.
 1st Canadian Infantry Brigade
 The Royal Canadian Regiment
 1st Battalion, The Hastings and Prince Edward Regiment
 1st Battalion, 48th Highlanders of Canada
 2nd Canadian Infantry Brigade
 Princess Patricia's Canadian Light Infantry
 1st Battalion, The Seaforth Highlanders of Canada
 1st Battalion, The Loyal Edmonton Regiment
 3rd Canadian Infantry Brigade
 Royal 22e Régiment
 1st Battalion, The Carleton and York Regiment
 1st Battalion, The West Nova Scotia Regiment
 1st Field Regiment, Royal Canadian Horse Artillery
 2nd Field Regiment, Royal Canadian Artillery
 3rd Field Regiment, Royal Canadian Artillery
 1st Infantry Division Support Battalion (The Saskatoon Light Infantry) (Machine Gun)
 1st Anti-Tank Regiment, Royal Canadian Artillery
 2nd Light Anti-Aircraft Regiment, Royal Canadian Artillery
 4th Reconnaissance Regiment (4th Princess Louise Dragoon Guards)
 No. 1 Defence and Employment Platoon (Lorne Scots)
 1st Field Company, Royal Canadian Engineers
 3rd Field Company, Royal Canadian Engineers
 4th Field Company, Royal Canadian Engineers
 2nd Field Park Company, Royal Canadian Engineers
 1st Canadian Tank Brigade
 11th Army Tank Regiment (The Ontario Regiment (Tank))
 12th Army Tank Regiment (Three Rivers Regiment (Tank))
 14th Army Tank Regiment (The Calgary Regiment (Tank))
 British 51st (Highland) Infantry DivisionCommanded by Major-General Douglas Wimberley.
 152nd Infantry Brigade
 5th Battalion, Queen's Own Cameron Highlanders
 2nd Battalion, Seaforth Highlanders
 5th Battalion, Seaforth Highlanders
 153rd Infantry Brigade
 5th Battalion, Black Watch
 1st Battalion, Gordon Highlanders
 5/7th Battalion, Gordon Highlanders
 154th Infantry Brigade
 1st Battalion, Black Watch
 7th Battalion, Black Watch
 7th Battalion, Argyll and Sutherland Highlanders
 126th (Highland) Field Regiment, Royal Artillery
 127th (Highland) Field Regiment, Royal Artillery
 128th (Highland) Field Regiment, Royal Artillery
 61st (West Highland) Anti-Tank Regiment, Royal Artillery
 40th Light Anti-Aircraft Regiment, Royal Artillery
 1st/7th Battalion, Middlesex Regiment (machine gun battalion)
 7th Battalion, Royal Marines (under command 19 to 29 July)
 274th Field Company, Royal Engineers
 275th Field Company, Royal Engineers
 276th Field Company, Royal Engineers
 239th Field Park Company, Royal Engineers
 23rd Armoured BrigadeHQ 23rd Armoured Brigade HQ fought as Arrow Force in mid-July with 2nd Battalion, Seaforth Highlanders (from 152nd Brigade) under command together with elements of 50th RTR and 11th (HAC) Regiment, Royal Horse Artillery as well as an Anti-Tank battery and a machine gun company.
 50th Royal Tank Regiment
 46th (Liverpool Welsh) Royal Tank Regiment
 40th (The King's) Royal Tank Regiment
 11th (Queen's Westminsters) Battalion, Kings Royal Rifle Corps
 British 231st Infantry Brigade
 2nd Battalion, Devonshire Regiment
 1st Battalion, Dorsetshire Regiment
 1st Battalion, Hampshire Regiment
 165th Field Regiment, Royal Artillery
 300th Anti-Tank Battery, Royal Artillery
 352nd Light Anti-Aircraft Battery, Royal Artillery
 295th Field Company, Royal Engineers
 200th Field Ambulance, Royal Army Medical Corps

Allied Mediterranean Naval Command
The Naval forces were under the command of Admiral of the Fleet Sir Andrew Cunningham and was divided into several Task Forces.

Covering Force
The role of the covering force was to prevent the Italian Navy from attacking the invasion forces.

Eastern Naval Task Force
Eastern Naval task Force transported the Eastern Task Force (British Eighth Army) and provided Naval gunfire support.

Western Naval Task Force
The Western Naval Task Force transported the Western Task Force (Seventh U.S. Army) and provided Naval gunfire support.
 8th U.S. Amphibious ForceCommand by Admiral Henry Kent Hewitt.
 80.2 Escort Group
 DesRon 7
 USS Plunkett (DD-431), Destroyers Flag
 DesDiv 13
  USS Niblack (DD-424)
  USS Benson (DD-421)
  USS Gleaves (DD-423)
 DesRon 8
 USS Wainwright (DD-419), Flag
 DesDiv 16
  USS Mayrant (DD-402)
  USS Trippe (DD-403)
  USS Rhind (DD-404)
  USS Rowan (DD-405)
 Shark Force
 Dime Force, Task Force 81, commanded by Rear Admiral John L. Hall Jr., USNThe Dime Task Force landed the U. S. Army First Division (reinforced) and attached units near Gela, Sicily.
 Cent Force, Task Force 85, commanded by Rear Admiral Alan G. Kirk, USNThe Cent Task Force landed the U. S. Army Forty-fifth Division (reinforced) and attached units near Scoglitti, Sicily.
 Joss Force, Task Force 86, commanded by Rear Admiral Richard L. Conolly, USNThe Joss Task Force landed the U. S. Third Division (reinforces) and attached units near Licata, Sicily.
 Task Force Organization
 86.1 Cover and Support Group, Rear Admiral Laurance T. DuBose, USN
 Cruiser Division 13
 Destroyer Squadron 13
 Nine LCG(L) British - Landing Craft Gun (Large)
 Eight LCF(L) British - Landing Craft, Flak (Large)
 86.2 Landing Craft Group, Commander L. S. Sabin, USN
 LST Groups Two
 LST Groups Three
   LST Group Six
 LST Division Seven (less LSTs 4 and 38)
   LCI Flotilla Two
   LCI Flotilla Four
   LCT Group Thirty oneLess LCTs 80, 207, 208, 214 Plus LCTs 276, 305 311, 332
   LCT 12 British LCTs
   HMS Princess Astrid - Landing Ship, Infantry (Small)
   HMS Prince Leopold - Landing Ship, Infantry (Small)
 86.3 Escort Group, Commander Block, USNR
 USS Seer (AM-112)
 USS Sentinel (AM-113)
 7 PCs
 26 SCs
 6 YMS - auxiliary motor minesweepers
 86.4 Joss Assault Force, Major General Truscott, USA
 U. S. Army 3rd Division (reinforces) and attached units
 86.5 Train
 USS Moreno (AT-87)
 USS Intent
 USS Evea (YT-458)
   USS Resolute
 86.6 Force Flagship
 USS Biscayne (AVP-11)
 86.9 Joint Loading Control, Captain Zimmerli, USN
 Kool Force (Floating Reserve)

Allied Air Forces
At the time of Operation Husky, the Allied air forces in the North African and Mediterranean theatres were organized as the Mediterranean Air Command (MAC) under the command of Air Chief Marshal Sir Arthur Tedder of the Royal Air Force. The major subdivisions of the MAC included the Northwest African Air Forces (NAAF) under the command of Lt. General Carl Spaatz of the U.S. Army Air Forces, the American 12th Air Force (also commanded by Gen. Spaatz), the American 9th Air Force under the command of Lt. General Lewis H. Brereton, and units of the British Royal Air Force (RAF).

Also supporting the NAAF were the RAF Middle East Command, Air Headquarters Malta, RAF Gibraltar, and the No. 216 (Transfer and Ferry) Group, which were subdivisions of MAC under the command of Tedder. He reported to the Supreme Allied Commander Dwight D. Eisenhower for the NAAF operations, but to the British Chiefs of Staff for RAF Command operations. Air Headquarters Malta, under the command of Air Vice-Marshal Sir Keith Park, also supported Operation Husky.

The "Desert Air Task Force" consisting of American B-25 Mitchell medium bombers (the 12th and 340th Bombardment Groups) and Curtiss P-40 Warhawk fighters (the 57th, 79th, and 324th Fighter Groups) from the 9th Air Force served under the command of Air Marshal Sir Arthur Coningham of the Northwest African Tactical Air Force. These bomber and fighter groups moved to new airfields on Sicily as soon as a significant beachhead had been captured there.

In the MAC organization established at the Casablanca Conference in January 1943, the 9th Air Force was assigned as a subdivision of the RAF Middle East Command under the command of Air Chief Marshal Sir Sholto Douglas.

Mediterranean Air Command (Allied)
Air Chief Marshal Sir Arthur Tedder had his headquarters in Algiers, Algeria.

Northwest African Air Forces
Lt. General Carl Spaatz had his headquarters for the Northwest African Air Forces in Maison-Carrée, Algeria

Northwest African Strategic Air Force
Maj. General James H. Doolittle, in command of the Northwest African Strategic Air Force, had his headquarters in Constantine, Algeria

 5th Bombardment Wing (Heavy)

Northwest African Coastal Air Force
Air Vice-Marshal Sir Hugh Lloyd also had his headquarters in Algiers.

 No. 242 Group RAF (Air Commodore Kenneth Cross)
 No. 323 Wing RAF
 No. 73 Squadron, Supermarine Spitfire fighter planes
 No. 255 Squadron, Bristol Beaufighters
 No. II/5 Escadre (French Air Force), P-40 Warhawk fighters
 No. II/7 Escadre (French Air Force), Spitfires
 No. 283 Squadron, Supermarine Walrus air-sea rescue planes
 No. 284 Squadron, Walrus air-sea aescue planes
 No. 328 Wing RAF
 No. 14 Squadron, Martin B-26 Marauder medium bombers
 No. 39 Squadron, Bristol Beaufort torpedo bombers
 No. 47 Squadron, Bristol Beauforts
 No. 144 Squadron, Beaufighters
 No. 52 Squadron, Martin Baltimore light bombers
 No. 221 Squadron (Det.), Vickers Wellington medium bombers
 No. 458 Squadron (RAAF), Wellington bombers

Notes:
 The 1st and 2nd Antisubmarine Squadrons were assigned to NACAF for administration and placed under the operational control of the U.S. Navy Fleet Air Wing 15 of the Moroccan Sea Frontier commanded by Rear Admiral (United States) Frank J. Lowry
 Air Ministry was asked to provide two additional Wellington patrol squadrons. Asked? This is supposed to be an accurate historical document. Many things get asked for, but many less get provided.

Northwest African Tactical Air Force
Air Marshal Sir Arthur Coningham had his headquarters in Hammamet, Tunisia

 ;Desert Air Force
Air Vice Marshal Harry Broadhurst
 No. 7 Wing, South African Air Force
 2 Squadron SAAF, Spitfire fighters
 4 Squadron SAAF, Spitfires
 5 Squadron SAAF, P-40 Kittyhawk fighters
 No. 239 (Fighter) Wing RAF, P-40 Kittyhawks
 No. 3 Squadron RAAF
 No. 112 Squadron RAF
 No. 250 Squadron RAF
 No. 260 Squadron RAF
 No. 450 Squadron RAAF
 No. 244 (Fighter) Wing RAF, Spitfires
 1 Squadron SAAF
 No. 92 Squadron RCAF
 No. 145 Squadron RAF
 No. 417 Squadron RCAF
 No. 601 (County of London) Squadron RAuxF
 No. 322 (Fighter) Wing RAF, Colin Falkland Gray, Spitfires
 No. 81 Squadron RAF
 No. 152 (Hyderabad) Squadron RAF
 No. 154 (Motor Industries) Squadron RAF
 No. 232 Squadron RAF
 No. 242 Squadron RAF
 No. 324 Wing RAF, Spitfires
 No. 43 Squadron RAF
 No. 72 Squadron RAF
 No. 93 Squadron RAF
 No. 111 Squadron RAF
 No. 243 Squadron RAF
 57th Fighter Group (USAAF)Colonel Arthur Salisbury
 64th Squadron, P-40 Warhawks
 65th Squadron, P-40 Warhawks
 66th Squadron, P-40 Warhawks
 79th Fighter Group (USAAF)Colonel Earl Bates
 85th Squadron, P-40 Warhawks
 86th Squadron, P-40 Warhawks
 87th Squadron, P-40 Warhawks
 No. 285 (Reconnaissance) Wing RAF
 40 Squadron SAAF, Detached, Spitfires
 60 Squadron SAAF, Mosquito fighter-bombers
 No. 1437 Flight RAF, P-51A Mustang fighters
 No. 6 Squadron, Hurricane ground attack
 ;XII Air Support CommandMaj. General Edwin House
 27th Fighter-Bomber Group (USAAF)Lt. Colonel John Stevenson
 522nd Squadron, A-36 Mustang ground attack aircraft
 523rd Squadron, A-36 Mustangs
 524th Squadron, A-36 Mustangs
 86th Fighter-Bomber Group (USAAF)Major Clinton True
 525th Squadron, A-36 Mustangs
 526th Squadron, A-36 Mustangs
 527th Squadron, A-36 Mustangs
 33d Fighter Group (USAAF)Colonel William W. Momyer
 58th Squadron, P-40 Warhawks
 59th Squadron, P-40 Warhawks
 60th Squadron, P-40 Warhawks
 99th Squadron, P-40, Detached
 324th Fighter Group (USAAF)Colonel William McNown
 314th Squadron, P-40 Warhawks
 315th Squadron, P-40 Warhawks
 316th Squadron, P-40 Warhawks
 31st Fighter Group (USAAF)Lt. Colonel Frank Hill
 307th Squadron, Spitfires
 308th Squadron, Spitfires
 309th Squadron, Spitfires
 111th Tactical Reconnaissance Squadron, P-51A Mustangs
 ;Tactical Bomber Force
Air Commodore Laurence Sinclair
 No. 3 Wing SAAF
 12 Squadron SAAF, Boston light bombers
 21 Squadron SAAF, Baltimore light bombers
 24 Squadron SAAF, Bostons
 No. 232 (Light Bomber) Wing RAF
 No. 55 Squadron RAF, Baltimores
 No. 223 Squadron RAF, Baltimores
 33d Fighter Group (USAAF)Colonel William W. Momyer
 58th Squadron, P-40 Warhawks
 59th Squadron, P-40 Warhawks
 60th Squadron, P-40 Warhawks
 99th Squadron, P-40, Detached
 No. 326 Wing RAF
 No. 18 Squadron RAF, Bostons
 No. 114 Squadron RAF, Bostons
 47th Bombardment Group (U.SA.A.F.)Colonel Malcolm Green, Jr.
 84th Squadron, A-20 Havoc
 85th Squadron, A-20 Havocs
 86th Squadron, A-20 Havocs
 97th Squadron, A-20 Havocs
 31st Fighter Group (U.S.A.A.F.)Lt. Colonel Frank Hill
 307th Squadron, Spitfires
 308th Squadron, Spitfires
 309th Squadron, Spitfires
 12th Bombardment Group (USAAF)Colonel Edward Backus
 81st Squadron, B-25 Mitchell medium bombers
 82nd Squadron, B-25 Mitchells
 83rd Squadron, B-25 Mitchells
 434th Squadron, B-25 Mitchells
 340th Bombardment Group (USAAF)Lt. Colonel Adolph Tokaz
 486th Squadron, B-25 Mitchells
 487th Squadron, B-25 Mitchells
 488th Squadron, B-25 Mitchells
 489th Squadron, B-25 Mitchells
 No. 225 Squadron RAF, Spitfires
 No. 241 Squadron RAF, Hurricanes

For Operation Husky, No. 242 Group, originally a component of NATAF in February 1943, was assigned to the Northwest African Coastal Air Force (NACAF). At the same time, Air Headquarters, Western Desert became known as the Desert Air Force.  All of the fighter units of Desert Air Force formed No. 211 (Offensive Fighter) Group commanded by Air Commodore Richard Atcherley on April 11, 1943 in Tripoli. The 99th Fighter Squadron was assigned to the XII Air Support Command on May 28, 1943, and later made a part of the 33rd Fighter Group.

Northwest African Troop Carrier Command
United States Paul Williams, in Tunisia

To help carry out transport and supply operations for Operation Husky, in mid-1943 the American 315th Troop Carrier Group (34th & 43rd Squadrons) had been flown from England to Tunisia. There it was assigned to the Mediterranean Air Transport Service, and  along with NATCC, this was a subdivision of the Mediterranean Air Command.

Northwest African Photographic Reconnaissance Wing
Colonel Elliott Roosevelt had his headquarters at La Marsa, Tunisia
 Northwest African Photographic Reconnaissance Wing
 3rd Photographic Group, Lt. Colonel Frank Dunn
 5th Combat Mapping Squadron, P-38 Lightnings
 12th Photographic Reconnaissance Squadron, P-38 Lightnings
 12th Weather Detachment 15th Photographic Reconnaissance Squadron, B-17 Flying Fortresses
 13th Photographic Reconnaissance Squadron photo intelligence squadron
 No. 60 Squadron SAAF Det., Mosquitos
 No. 540 Squadron RAF Det., Mosquitos
 No. 680 Squadron RAF, Spitfires
 2/33 Groupe (French), P-38 Lightnings (F-5 reconnaissance planes)

Northwest African Air Service Command
Brig. General Delmar had his headquarters in Dunton, Algiers.

Northwest African Training Command
Brig. General John K. Cannon, U.S. APO 525

Air Headquarters Malta
Air Vice-Marshal Keith Park, the commander of Air Headquarters Malta, had his headquarters in Valletta, Malta
 No. 248 (Naval Co-operation) Wing
 No. 69 Squadron RAF, Baltimores
 No. 108 Squadron RAF, Beaufighters
 No. 221 Squadron RAF, Wellington bombers
 No. 272 Squadron RAF, Beaufighters
 No. 683 Squadron RAF, Spitfires
 Spitfire fighter plane units
 No. 40 Squadron SAAF of the South African Air Force
 No. 126 Squadron RAF
 No. 185 Squadron RAF
 No. 229 Squadron RAF
 No. 249 Squadron RAF
 No. 1435 Flight RAF
 Other units
 No. 23 Squadron RAF, counter-night-intruder operations with Mosquito fighter planes
 No. 73 Squadron RAF Detachment (Det.), with Hurricane fighter planes
 No. 256 Squadron RAF Det., with Mosquito night fighters
 No. 600 Squadron RAF, Beaufighter night fighters
 815 Naval Air Squadron Det. (Fleet Air Arm), Fairey Albacores

No. 216 (Transport and Ferry) Group
Air Commodore Whitney Straight, Headquarters at Heliopolis, Egypt

 No. 17 Squadron SAAF, Junkers 52
 No. 28 Squadron SAAF, Anson
 No. 117 Squadron RAF, Hudson
 No. 173 Squadron RAF, Lodestar, Proctor, Hurricane
 No. 216 Squadron RAF, Douglas Dakota
 No. 230 Squadron RAF, Short Sunderland
 No. 267 Squadron RAF, Hudson

RAF Gibraltar
Air Vice Marshal Sturley Simpson had his headquarters in Gibraltar

 No. 48 Squadron RAF, Hudsons
 No. 179 Squadron RAF, Wellingtons
 No. 202 Squadron RAF, Catalinas
 No. 210 Squadron RAF, Catalinas
 No. 233 Squadron RAF, Hudsons
 No. 248 Squadron RAF, Beaufighters
 No. 544 Squadron RAF, Spitfires
 813 Naval Air Squadron (Fleet Air Arm), Swordfish torpedo planes
 No. 1403 (Meteorological) Flight Hampden, Gloster Gladiators

Middle East Command
Air Marshal Sir Sholto Douglas
Headquarters at Cairo, Egypt

No. 201 (Naval Co-operation) Group
Air Vice Marshal Thomas Langsford-Sainsbury, Headquarters at Alexandria, Egypt

 No. 235 Wing
 No. 13 Squadron (Royal Hellenic Air Force), Blenheim bombers
 No. 227 Squadron RAF Det., Beaufighters
 No. 454 Squadron RAAF, Baltimores
 No. 459 Squadron RAAF, Hudsons
 815 Naval Air Squadron (FAA), Swordfish
 No. 238 Wing
 No. 16 Squadron SAAF, Beauforts
 No. 227 Squadron RAF Beaufighters
 No. 603 Squadron RAF, Beaufighters
 815 Naval Air Squadron (FAA), Swordfish
 No. 245 Wing
 No. 15 Squadron SAAF, Blenheims and Baltimores
 No. 38 Squadron RAF, Wellingtons
 No. 1 General Reconnaissance Unit, Wellingtons
 No. 247 Wing
 No. 38 Squadron RAF, Wellingtons
 No. 203 Squadron RAF, Baltimores
 No. 227 Squadron RAF, Beaufighters
 No. 252 Squadron RAF, Beaufighters

No Wing assignment: 701 Naval Air Squadron (FAA), Walrus Air-Sea Rescue

Note:
RAF=Royal Air Force; RAAF=Royal Australian Air Force; SAAF=South African Air Force; FAA=Fleet Air Arm (Royal Navy); Det.= "detachment"

Air Headquarters Air Defences Eastern Mediterranean
Air Vice Marshal Richard Saul

Notes:
SAAF=South African Air Force; RAAF=Royal Australian Air Forces; Det.=Detached; Met.=Meteorological.

U.S. 9th Air Force

Major General Lewis H. Brereton had his headquarters in Cairo, Egypt
 IX Advanced Headquarters in Tripoli, Libya
 IX Fighter Command Headquarters in Tripoli
 IX Bomber Command Headquarters at Benghazi, Libya
 98th Bombardment Group, B-24D Liberator II
 343rd Squadron, Lete Airfield, Libya
 344th Squadron, Lete Airfield
 345th Squadron, Benina Airfield
 415th Squadron, Benina Airfield
 376th Bombardment Group, B-24D Liberator II, Berka, Libya
 512th Squadron
 513th Squadron
 514th Squadron
 515th Squadron

 Axis Forces 
 Armed Forces Command Sicily 
The Armed Forces Command Sicily based in Enna under Generale d'Armata Alfredo Guzzoni had command of all axis forces on Sicily.

 Italian 6th Army 
The Royal Italian Army's 6th Army co-located with Armed Forces Command Sicily in Enna and also commanded by Generale d'Armata Alfredo Guzzoni had command of all Royal Italian Army and German Army units on Sicily.The German Army Liaison Officer was Generalleutnant Fridolin von Senger und Etterlin
 6th Army, in Enna - Generale d'Armata Alfredo Guzzoni; Chief of Staff Generale di Brigata Emilio Faldella
 10th Self-propelled Anti-tank Grouping, in Agrigento
 CLXI Anti-tank Group, in San Michele di Ganzaria (90/53 self-propelled guns)
 CLXII Anti-tank Group, in Borgesati (90/53 self-propelled guns)
 CLXIII Anti-tank Group, in Paternò (90/53 self-propelled guns)
 131st Tank Infantry Regiment (commands Mobile Group "H")
 XII Tank Battalion "L" (detached to Mobile Group "A")
 1st Tank Company (Fiat 3000 tanks; detached to XII Army Corps for static airfield defense)
 2nd Tank Company (Fiat 3000 tanks; detached to Mobile Group "H")
 CI Tank Battalion (R35 tanks); detached mobile groups D, E, and F)
 CII Tank Battalion (R35 tanks; detached to mobile groups A, B, and C)
 IV Self-propelled Anti-tank Battalion (47/32 L40 self-propelled guns; detached to 4th Infantry Division "Livorno")
 CXXXIII Self-propelled Anti-tank Battalion (47/32 L40 self-propelled guns; detached to mobile groups A, B, and C)
 CCXXXIII Self-propelled Anti-tank Battalion (47/32 L40 self-propelled guns; detached to XII Army Corps)
 XII Dismounted Squadrons Group/ Regiment "Cavalleggeri di Palermo"
 II Battalion/ 10th Arditi Regiment
 DV Self-propelled Anti-aircraft Artillery Group (90/53 anti-aircraft guns mounted on Breda 51 trucks)
 2x Bersaglieri motorcyclist companies
 2x Anti-aircraft artillery batteries (20/65 anti-aircraft guns)
 1x Anti-aircraft artillery battery (75/46 anti-aircraft guns)
 19th Mining Engineers Company
 Army Services

The 6th Army fielded more than 100 Anti-paratrooper units of about 30 men each. These units, with the oldest available local reservists, were tasked with searching for allied  personnel - paratroopers and pilots - which had parachuted into Sicily behind the frontline.

 Italian XII Army Corps 
 XII Army Corps, in Corleone - Generale di Corpo d'Armata Mario Arisio, from 12 July: Generale di Corpo d'Armata Francesco Zingales - responsible for Sicily to the West of a line from Cefalù to Licata
 12th Army Corps Artillery Grouping
 XIX Motorized Artillery Group (105/28 howitzers)
 XXI Motorized Artillery Group (105/28 howitzers)
 XXII Motorized Artillery Group (105/28 howitzers)
 XLVIII Motorized Artillery Group (105/28 howitzers)
 CXXI Motorized Artillery Group (149/13 howitzers)
 CXXII Motorized Artillery Group (149/13 howitzers)
 VII Anti-aircraft Artillery Group (75/46 anti-aircraft guns)
 CIV Anti-tank Battalion, in Agrigento (47/32 anti-tank guns) (detached to 177th Mobile Territorial Bersaglieri Regiment)
 CX Motorized Artillery Group (75/27 field guns; 2nd Battery detached to Mobile Group "A")
 CLI Coastal Artillery Group (149/19 heavy guns, reinforcements from the Italian mainland)
 CCXXXIII Motorized Artillery Group (75/27 field guns; detached to 26th Infantry Division "Assietta")
 I Bersaglieri Anti-tank Battalion, in Corleone (47/32 anti-tank guns)
 1x Engineer battalion
 2x Bersaglieri motorcyclist companies
 2x Anti-aircraft artillery batteries (20/65 anti-aircraft guns)
 Army Corps Services

 Coastal Troops Command 
 Coastal Troops Command - Generale di Divisione Giovanni Marciani
 136th (Autonomous) Coastal Regiment - responsible for the coast from the East of Palermo to including Cefalù
 CIII Coastal Battalion
 CDLXV Coastal Battalion
 202nd Coastal Division - Generale di Brigata Gino Ficalbi - responsible for the coast from Mazara del Vallo to Sciacca
 124th Coastal Regiment
 CCCLXXVI Coastal Battalion
 CCCLXXXVI Coastal Battalion
 DXLIII Coastal Battalion
 142nd Coastal Regiment
 CCCLXXVII Coastal Battalion
 CDXXVII Coastal Battalion
 CDLXVI Coastal Battalion
 CDXC Coastal Battalion
 62nd Coastal Artillery Grouping
 LVI Coastal Artillery Group (149/35 heavy guns)
 LXXVI Coastal Artillery Group (149/35 heavy guns)
 CLXXI Coastal Artillery Group (105/28 howitzers)
 CLXXII Coastal Artillery Group (105/28 howitzers)
 63rd Coastal Artillery Grouping
 LV Coastal Artillery Group 105/32 field guns)
 CXLI Coastal Artillery Group (75/27 field guns)
 CXLIII Coastal Artillery Group (149/35 howitzers))
 CLVII Coastal Artillery Group (149/19 howitzers)
 CCCIII Coastal Battalion
 CIX Static Machine Gun Battalion
 151st Bersaglieri Motorcyclists Company
 102nd Mortar Company (81mm Mod. 35 mortars)
 Division Services
 207th Coastal Division, in Agrigento - Generale di Brigata Ottorino Schreiber, later Generale di Brigata Augusto De Laurentiis - responsible for the coast from Sciacca to Punta Due Rocche to the East of Licata
 138th Coastal Regiment
 CCCLXXX Coastal Battalion
 CCCLXXXVIII Coastal Battalion
 CDXX Coastal Battalion
 139th Coastal Regiment, in Licata
 CDXIX Coastal Battalion
 CCCXC Coastal Battalion
 DXXXVIII Coastal Battalion
 177th Mobile Territorial Bersaglieri Regiment (attached)
 DXXV Bersaglieri Battalion
 DXXVI Bersaglieri Battalion
 DXXVII Bersaglieri Battalion
 CIV Anti-tank Battalion (47/32 anti-tank guns; detached from 12th Army Corps Artillery Grouping)
 1st Motorized Machine Gun Company (attached)
 12th Coastal Artillery Grouping
 XXXV Coastal Artillery Group (3x 105/28 and 1x 75/27 batteries)
 CXLV Coastal Artillery Group (2x 105/28 and 1x 75/34 batteries)
 CLX Coastal Artillery Group (2x 149/35 and 1x 105mm/27 batteries)
 CCXXII Coastal Artillery Group (2x 100/22 batteries)
 CIV Coastal Battalion
 CV Static Machine Gun Battalion
 103rd Mortar Company (81mm Mod. 35 mortars)
 Division Services
 208th Coastal Division - Generale di Divisione Giovanni Marciani (nominal) - Colonel Dal Monte (effective) - responsible for the coast from Palermo to Trapani
 133rd Coastal Regiment
 CCXLIV Coastal Battalion
 CDXXIII Coastal Battalion
 CDXCVIII Coastal Battalion
 147th Coastal Regiment
 CCCLXXVIII Coastal Battalion
 CDXXXVIII Coastal Battalion
 DXXXIX Coastal Battalion
 28th Coastal Artillery Grouping
 CXXIV Coastal Artillery Group (105/14 howitzers
 CCXV Coastal Artillery Group (100/17 howitzers)
 CXII Machine Gun Battalion
 164th Anti-tank Company (47/32 anti-tank guns)
 101st Mortar Company (81mm Mod. 35 mortars)
 517th Mortar Company (81mm Mod. 35 mortars)
 Division Services
 230th Coastal Division - Generale di Divisione Egisto Conti - responsible for the coast from the South of Trapani to Mazara del Vallo (division raised on 1 June 1943 from personnel of the 8th Marching Division and arrived in Sicily on 3 July 1943, augmented with units of the 202nd Coastal Division)
 120th Coastal Regiment
 CCXLV Coastal Battalion
 DCCCLVII Coastal Battalion
 DCCCLXXX Coastal Battalion
 184th Coastal Regiment
 CCCLXXXVII Coastal Battalion
 CDXCVII Coastal Battalion
 43rd Coastal Artillery Grouping
 VII Coastal Artillery Group (1x 149/35 and 1x 155/36 batteries)
 XX Coastal Artillery Group (1x 149/35 and 1x 155/36 batteries)
 XXII Coastal Artillery Group (105/28 howitzers)
 CCXVIII Coastal Artillery Group (100/22 howitzers)
 712th Machine Gun Company
 Division Services
 XXIX Coastal Brigade - Harbor Defense Command "N", in Palermo - Generale di Divisione Giuseppe Molinero
 CCCIV Coastal Battalion
 CCCXLIV Coastal Battalion
 CDLXXVI Coastal Battalion
 XXX Dismounted Squadrons Group/ Regiment "Cavalleggeri di Palermo"
 I Group/ 25th Artillery Regiment "Assietta"/ 26th Infantry Division "Assietta" (100/17 howitzers)
 XLI Coastal Artillery Group
 121st Battery, at Punta la Barbara (2x 152/45 cannons)
 122nd Battery, at Aspra (2x 152/45 cannons)
 2x batteries (1x with 75/27 field guns, 1x with 105/28 howitzers)
 51st Heavy Artillery Battery

 Tactical Groups 
Tactical groups were created from corps assets and detached units of the army corps's two infantry divisions. The groups were deployed near the beaches most likely to be used by the allies.
 Tactical Group "Chiusa Sclafani", in Chiusa Sclafani
 10th Bersaglieri Regiment
 XXXV Bersaglieri Battalion
 LXXIII Bersaglieri Battalion
 LXXIV Bersaglieri Battalion
 CIII Motorized Artillery Group (75/27 field guns)
 4th Self-propelled Company (75/18 self-propelled guns)
 10th Armored Car Squadron (AB 41 armored cars)
 Tactical Group "Alcamo-Partinico", in the area of Alcamo and Partinico
 171st CC.NN. Legion "Vespri"/ 28th Infantry Division "Aosta"
 CLXVIII CC.NN. Battalion
 CLXXI CC.NN. Battalion
 171st CC.NN. Machine Gun Company
 I Group/ 22nd Artillery Regiment "Aosta" (75/27 field guns)
 Tactical Group "Inchiapparo-Casale", in the area of Inchiapparo and Casale
 LI Bersaglieri Battalion
 82nd Anti-tank Battery (75/39 anti-tank guns)
 Tactical Group "Campobello-Ravanusa", in the area of Campobello di Licata and Ravanusa
 I Squadrons Group/ Regiment "Cavalleggeri di Palermo"
 XVII CC.NN. Battalion/ 17th CC.NN. Legion "Cremona"/ 26th Infantry Division "Assietta"
 259th Machine Gun Company/ 17th CC.NN. Legion "Cremona"/ 26th Infantry Division "Assietta"

 Mobile Groups 
Mobile groups were fully motorized battle groups created from corps assets and detached units of the army corps's two infantry divisions. The groups were deployed near the beaches most likely to be used by the allies.
 Mobile Group "A", in Paceco - Lieutenant Colonel Renato Perrone
 Headquarters Company/ XII Tank Battalion "L"
 1st Company/ CXXXIII Self-propelled Anti-tank Battalion (47/32 L40 self-propelled guns)
 4th Company/ CII Tank Battalion (R35 tanks)
 3rd Company/ CDXLVIII Motorized Coastal Battalion
 2nd Battery/ CX Motorized Artillery Group (75/27 field guns)
 2nd Section/ 328th Anti-aircraft Battery/ 22nd Artillery Regiment "Aosta" (20/65 anti-aircraft guns)
 Mobile Group "B", in Santa Ninfa - Lieutenant Colonel Vito Gaetano Mascio
 Headquarters Company/ CXXXIII Self-propelled Anti-tank Battalion
 3rd Company/ CXXXIII Self-propelled Anti-tank Battalion (47/32 self-propelled guns)
 6th Company/ CII Tank Battalion (R35 tanks)
 1st and 2nd companies/ CDXLVIII Motorized Coastal Battalion
 161st Bersaglieri Motorcyclists Company
 6th Battery/ CCXXXIII Motorized Artillery Group (75/27 field guns)
 2nd Section/ 10th Anti-aircraft Battery/ 25th Artillery Regiment "Assietta" (20/65 anti-aircraft guns)
 Mobile Group "C", in Portella Misilbesi - Lieutenant Colonel Osvaldo Mazzei
 Headquarters Company/ CII Tank Battalion
 2nd Company/ CXXXIII Self-propelled Anti-tank Battalion (47/32 self-propelled guns)
 5th Company/ CII Tank Battalion (R35 tanks)
 4th Company/ CDXLVIII Motorized Coastal Battalion
 104th Anti-tank company (47/32 anti-tank guns)
 10th Battery/ IV Group/ 25th Artillery Regiment "Assietta" (75/27 field guns)
 4th Section/ 326th Anti-aircraft Battery/ 25th Artillery Regiment "Assietta" (20/65 anti-aircraft guns)

 XII Army Corps Reserve 
The 26th Infantry Division "Assietta" had been transferred from its bases and recruiting area in eastern Piedmont to Sicily in August 1941. The division's pre-deployment headquarters were in Asti, while's its two infantry regiments had been based in Asti (29th) and Tortona (30th), with the division's artillery regiment also based at Asti.
 26th Infantry Division "Assietta" - Generale di Divisione Francesco Scotti, from 26 July: Generale di Brigata Ottorino Schreiber
 29th Infantry Regiment "Assietta"
 3x Fusilier battalions
 Support Weapons Company (65/17 infantry support guns)
 Mortar Company (81mm Mod. 35 mortars)
 30th Infantry Regiment "Assietta"
 3x Fusilier battalions
 Support Weapons Company (65/17 infantry support guns)
 Mortar Company (81mm Mod. 35 mortars)
 17th CC.NN. Legion "Cremona"
 XVII CC.NN. Battalion (detached to Tactical Group "Campobello-Ravanusa")
 XVIII CC.NN. Battalion
 259th CC.NN. Machine Gun Company (detached to Tactical Group "Campobello-Ravanusa")
 25th Artillery Regiment "Assietta"
 I Artillery Group (100/17 howitzers; detached to XXIX Coastal Brigade)
 II Artillery Group (100/17 howitzers)
 III Artillery Group (75/27 field guns)
 IV Artillery Group (75/27 field guns; 10th Battery detached to Mobile Group "C")
 10th Anti-aircraft Battery (20/65 anti-aircraft guns; 2nd Section detached to Mobile Group "B")
 326th Anti-aircraft Battery (20/65 anti-aircraft guns; 4th Sections detached to Mobile Group "C")
 XXVI Mortar Battalion (81mm Mod. 35 mortars)
 CXXVI Machine Gun Battalion
 CCXXXIII Motorized Artillery Group (75/27 field guns; 6th Battery detached to Mobile Group "C")
 Mixed Engineer Battalion
 50th Bersaglieri Motorcyclists Company (attached)
 126th Anti-tank Company (47/32 anti-tank guns)
 Division Services

The 28th Infantry Division "Aosta" was one of three divisions, which recruited in Sicily. It mainly drafted men from western Sicily and had its peacetime headquarters in Palermo. It's two infantry regiments were based in Trapani (5th) and Palermo (6th), where also the division's artillery regiment was based.
 28th Infantry Division "Aosta" - Generale di Divisione Giuseppe Romano
 5th Infantry Regiment "Aosta"
 3x Fusilier battalions
 Support Weapons Company (65/17 infantry support guns)
 Mortar Company (81mm Mod. 35 mortars)
 6th Infantry Regiment "Aosta"
 3x Fusilier battalions
 Support Weapons Company (65/17 infantry support guns)
 Mortar Company (81mm Mod. 35 mortars)
 171st CC.NN. Legion "Vespri" (detached as Tactical Group "Alcamo-Partinico")
 CLXVIII CC.NN. Battalion
 CLXXI CC.NN. Battalion
 171st CC.NN. Machine Gun Company
 22nd Artillery Regiment "Aosta"
 I Artillery Group (75/27 field guns; detached to Tactical Group "Alcamo-Partinico")
 II Artillery Group (75/27 howitzers)
 III Motorized Group (75/18 Mod. 35 field guns)
 IV Artillery Group (75/13 mountain guns)
 328th Anti-aircraft Battery (20/65 anti-aircraft guns; 2nd Section detached to Mobile Group "A")
 365th Anti-aircraft Battery (20/65 anti-aircraft guns)
 XXVIII Mortar Battalion (81mm Mod. 35 mortars)
 CXXVIII Mixed Engineer Battalion
 28th Anti-tank Company (47/32 anti-tank guns)
 Division Services

 Italian XVI Army Corps 
 XVI Army Corps, in Piazza Armerina - Generale di Corpo d'Armata Carlo Rossi - responsible for Sicily to the East of a line from Cefalù to Gela
 40th Army Corps Artillery Grouping, in Piazza Armerina
 X Motorized Artillery Group (105/28 howitzers)
 XVI Motorized Artillery Group (105/28 howitzers)
 XXIX Motorized Artillery Group (105/28 howitzers)
 CIX Motorized Artillery Group (149/13 howitzers)
 CX Heavy Artillery Group (149/13 howitzers)
 16th Army Corps Engineer Grouping
 LVIII Bersaglieri Battalion
 XII Army Corps Machine Gun Battalion
 CCXXXIII Self-propelled Anti-tank Battalion (47/32 L40 self-propelled guns)
 XI Anti-aircraft Artillery Group (75/46 anti-aircraft guns)
 1x Engineer battalion
 Army Corps Services

 Coastal Troops Command 
 Coastal Troops Command - Generale di Divisione Achille d'Havet
 206th Coastal Division, in Modica - Generale di Divisione Achille d'Havet - responsible for the coast from Punta Braccetto in Santa Croce Camerina to Arenella to the South of Syracuse
 122nd Coastal Regiment
 CCXLIII Coastal Battalion
 CCCLXXV Coastal Battalion
 123rd Coastal Regiment
 CCCLXXXI Coastal Battalion
 CCCLXXXIII Coastal Battalion
 DXLII Coastal Battalion
 146th Coastal Regiment
 CCCLXXIV Coastal Battalion
 CDXXX Coastal Battalion
 CDXXXVII Coastal Battalion
 44th Coastal Artillery Grouping
 CII Coastal Artillery Group (75/27 field guns)
 CLXI Coastal Artillery Group (149/35 heavy guns)
 CLXIV Coastal Artillery Group (149/35 heavy guns)
 CCIX Coastal Artillery Group (100/22 howitzers)
 CCXXIV Coastal Artillery Group (100/22 howitzers)
 227th Coastal Artillery Battery (105/14 howitzers)
 DXLII Mobile Territorial Bersaglieri Battalion (attached, 2nd Company detached to Mobile Group "F")
 CIV Static Machine Gun Battalion
 CCXX Self-propelled Anti-tank Battalion (attached; 47/32 L40 self-propelled guns)
 122nd Engineer Platoon
 2x Anti-paratrooper units
 Division Services
 213th Coastal Division, Generale di Brigata Carlo Gotti - responsible for the coast from Punta Castelluccio in Agnone Bagni to Moleti south of Messina
 135th Coastal Regiment
 XII Coastal Battalion
 CII Coastal Battalion
 CCCLXIX Coastal Battalion
 CCCLXXII Coastal Battalion
 21st Coastal Artillery Grouping
 XXX Coastal Artillery Group (105/28 howitzers)
 XC Coastal Artillery Group (2x 149/19 and 2x 149/35 heavy gun batteries)
 CXLIV Coastal Artillery Group (105/14 howitzers)
 CCXXX Coastal Artillery Group (100/22 howitzers)
 CLIII Static Machine Gun Battalion
 Division Services
 XVIII Coastal Brigade, in Niscemi Generale di Brigata Orazio Mariscalco - responsible for the coast from Punta Due Rocche to the East of Licata to Punta Braccetto in Santa Croce Camerina
 134th Coastal Regiment
 CDXXIX Coastal Battalion
 CCCLXXXIV Coastal Battalion
 178th Coastal Regiment
 DI Coastal Battalion (4th Company detached to Mobile Group "E")
 CCCLXXXIX Coastal Battalion
 60th Coastal Artillery Grouping
 XXI Coastal Artillery Group (2x 75/27 field gun and 2x 75/34 anti-tank gun batteries)
 LXXXI Coastal Artillery Group (75/32 field guns)
 CLXII Coastal Artillery Group (149/35 heavy guns)
 CCIX Coastal Artillery Group (100/22 howitzers)
 81st Artillery Battery (75/34 anti-tank guns)
 106th Mortar Company (81mm Mod. 35 mortars)
 426th Mortar Company (81mm Mod. 35 mortars)
 268th Anti-tank Company (47/32 anti-tank guns)
 288th Artillery Battery (155/36 guns)
 455th, 456th, 526th, and 332nd Anti-paratrooper units
 Brigade Services
 XIX Coastal Brigade, Generale di Brigata Giovanni Bocchetti - responsible for the coast from the West of Messina to, but excluding, Cefalù
 140th Coastal Regiment
 CI Coastal Battalion
 CDXLVII Coastal Battalion
 179th Coastal Regiment
 CDXXXV Coastal Battalion
 D Coastal Battalion
 61st Coastal Artillery Grouping
 Coastal Artillery Group (4x batteries of 75/27 field guns)
 Coastal Artillery Group (4x batteries of 122/45 howitzers)
 128th Coastal Artillery Battery (105/28 howitzers)
 XV Anti-tank battalion (attached; 47/32 anti-tank guns)
 52nd Bersaglieri Motorcyclists Company (attached)
 104th Mortar Company (81mm Mod. 35 mortars)
 413th Static Mortar Company (81mm Mod. 35 mortars)
 Brigade Services
 Harbor Defense Command "H", in Catania - Generale di Brigata Azzo Passalacqua
 CDXXXIV Coastal Battalion
 CDLXXVII Coastal Battalion
 XXVI Coastal Artillery Group (75/27 field guns)
 105th Mortar Company (81mm Mod. 35 mortars)

 Tactical Groups 
Tactical groups were created from corps assets and detached units of the army corps's two infantry divisions. The groups were deployed near the beaches most likely to be used by the allies.
 Tactical Group "Barcellona", in Barcellona Pozzo di Gotto
 Headquarters Company/ CIII Anti-tank Battalion
 2nd Company/ CIII Anti-tank Battalion (47/32 anti-tank guns)
 7th Bersaglieri Motorcyclists Company
 12th Battery/ IV Group/ 54th Artillery Regiment "Napoli" (75/18 field guns)
 Arditi Platoon/ CDXLVII Coastal Battalion
 Tactical Group "Carmito", in Carmito
 IV Self-propelled Anti-tank Battalion/ 4th Infantry Division "Livorno" (47/32 L40 self-propelled guns)
 53rd Bersaglieri Motorcyclists Company
 Tactical Group "Comiso-Ispica", in the area of Comiso and Ispica - Colonel Busalacchi
 CLXXIII CC.NN. Battalion
 I Group/ 54th Artillery Regiment "Napoli" (100/17 howitzers)
 174th CC.NN. Machine Gun Company
 2nd Company/ LIV Mortar Battalion/ 54th Infantry Division "Napoli" (81mm Mod. 35 mortars)
 1x Anti-Tank platoon (47mm/32)
 Tactical Group "Linguaglossa", in Linguaglossa
 LVII Bersaglieri Battalion
 54th Bersaglieri Motorcyclists Company
 11th Battery/ IV Group/ 54th Artillery Regiment "Napoli" (75/18 Mod. 35 field guns)

 Mobile Groups 
Mobile groups were fully motorized battle groups created from corps assets and detached units of the army corps's two infantry divisions. The groups were deployed near the beaches most likely to be used by the allies.
 Mobile Group "D", in Misterbianco - Lieutenant Colonel Massimino D'Andretta
 Headquarters Company/ CI Tank Battalion
 3rd Company/ CI Tank Battalion (R35 tanks)
 2nd Bersaglieri Motorcyclists Company
 7th Company/ II Fusilier Battalion/ 76th Infantry Regiment "Napoli"
 1st Company/ CIII Anti-tank Battalion (47/32 anti-tank guns)
 10th Battery/ IV Group/ 54th Artillery Regiment "Napoli" (75/18 Mod. 35 field guns)
 1st Section/ 354th Anti-aircraft Battery/ 54th Infantry Division "Napoli" (20/65 anti-aircraft guns)
 Mobile Group "E", in Niscemi - Captain Giuseppe Granieri (destroyed in the Battle of Gela)
 1st Company/ CI Tank Battalion (R35 tanks)
 2nd Company/ CII Anti-tank Battalion (47/32 anti-tank guns)
 155th Bersaglieri Motorcyclists Company
 4th Company/ DI Coastal Battalion/ XVIII Coastal Brigade
 9th Battery/ III Group/ 54th Artillery Regiment "Napoli" (75/18 field guns)
 1st Section/ 21st Anti-aircraft Battery/ 54th Infantry Division "Napoli" (20/65 anti-aircraft guns)
 Mobile Group "F", in Rosolini
 Headquarters Company/ CII Anti-tank Battalion
 2nd Company/ CI Tank Battalion (R35 tanks, 1x platoon detached to Mobile Group "G")
 3rd Bersaglieri Motorcyclists Company
 2nd Company/ DXLII Mobile Territorial Bersaglieri Battalion
 1st Company/ CII Anti-tank Battalion (47/32 anti-tank guns)
 2nd Battery/ CXXVI Motorized Artillery Group (75/27 field guns)
 Mobile Group "G", in Comiso - Lieutenant Colonel Porcù
 CLXIX CC.NN. Battalion/ 173rd CC.NN. Legion "Salso"/ 54th Infantry Division "Napoli"
 3rd Company/ CII Anti-tank Battalion (47/32 anti-tank guns)
 8th Battery/ III Group/ 54th Artillery Regiment "Napoli" (75/18 field guns)
 1x Platoon/ 2nd Company/ CI Tank Battalion (R35 tanks)
 Mobile Group "H", in Caltagirone - Lieutenant Colonel Luigi Cixi
 Headquarters Company/ 131st Tank Infantry Regiment
 2nd Tank Company (9x Fiat 3000 tanks)
 3rd Company/ CIII Anti-tank Battalion (47/32 anti-tank guns)
 7th Battery/ III Group/ 54th Artillery Regiment "Napoli" (75/18 field guns)
 1x Platoon/ Mortar Company/ 76th Infantry Regiment "Napoli" (81mm Mod. 35 mortars)

 XVI Army Corps Reserve 
The 4th Infantry Division "Livorno" had been transferred from its bases and recruiting area in southern Piedmont to Sicily in February 1943. Initially intended as reinforcement for Army Group Africa fighting in Tunisia, the Army Group's disastrous situation and retreat to Tunis prevented the division's transfer to Tunisia. The division's pre-deployment headquarters were in Cuneo, while's its two infantry regiments had been based in Cuneo (33rd) and Fossano (34th), where also the division's artillery regiment had been based.
 4th Infantry Division "Livorno" - Generale di Divisione Domenico Chirieleison
 33rd Infantry Regiment "Livorno"
 3x Fusilier battalions (2x motorized)
 Support Weapons Company (65/17 infantry support guns)
 Mortar Company (81mm Mod. 35 mortars)
 34th Infantry Regiment "Livorno"
 3x Fusilier battalions (2x motorized)
 Support Weapons Company (65/17 infantry support guns)
 Mortar Company (81mm Mod. 35 mortars)
 185th Infantry Regiment "Nembo" (attached from 3 to 13 August 1943)
 III Paratroopers Battalion
 VIII Paratroopers Battalion
 XI Paratroopers Battalion
 Cannons Company (47/32 anti-tank guns)
 28th Artillery Regiment "Livorno"
 I Motorized Group (100/17 howitzers)
 II Motorized Group (100/17 howitzers)
 III Motorized Group (75/18 Mod. 35 field guns)
 IV Motorized Group (75/18 field guns)
 78th Anti-aircraft Battery (20/65 anti-aircraft guns)
 2x Anti-aircraft batteries (20/65 anti-aircraft guns)
 IV Self-propelled Anti-tank Battalion (47/32 L40 self-propelled guns; detached to Tactical Group "Carmito")
 IV Mortar Battalion (81mm Mod. 35 mortars)
 IV Motorized Engineer Battalion
 XI Sapper Battalion (attached)
 4th Anti-tank Company (47/32 anti-tank guns)
 Division Services

The 54th Infantry Division "Napoli" was one of three divisions, which recruited in Sicily. It mainly drafted men from southern Sicily and had its peacetime headquarters in Caltanissetta. It's two infantry regiments were based in Syracuse (75th) and Agrigento (76th), while the division's artillery regiment was based in Caltanissetta.
 54th Infantry Division "Napoli", Generale di Divisione Giulio Cesare Gotti Porcinari
 75th Infantry Regiment "Napoli"
 3x Fusilier battalions
 Support Weapons Company (47/32 anti-tank guns)
 Mortar Company (81mm Mod. 35 mortars)
 76th Infantry Regiment "Napoli"
 3x Fusilier battalions (7th Company/ II Fusilier Battalion detached to Mobile Group "D")
 Support Weapons Company (47/32 anti-tank guns)
 Mortar Company (81mm Mod. 35 mortars; one platoon detached to Mobile Group "H")
 173rd CC.NN. Legion "Salso"
 CLXIX CC.NN. Battalion (detached to Mobile Group "G")
 CLXXIII CC.NN. Battalion (detached to Tactical Group "Comiso-Ispica")
 174th CC.NN. Machine Gun Company (detached to Tactical Group "Comiso-Ispica")
 54th Artillery Regiment "Napoli"
 I Group (100/17 howitzers, detached to Tactical Group "Comiso-Ispica")
 II Group (75/27 field guns)
 III Motorized Group (75/18 Mod. 35 field guns; all batteries detached to tactical and mobile groups)
 IV Motorized Group (75/18 field guns; all batteries detached to mobile groups)
 21st Anti-aircraft Battery (20/65 anti-aircraft guns; 1st Section detached to Mobile Group "E")
 354th Anti-aircraft Battery (20/65 anti-aircraft guns; 1st Section detached to Mobile Group "D")
 LIV Machine Gun Battalion (81mm Mod. 35 mortars)
 LIV Mortar Battalion (81mm Mod. 35 mortars, 2nd Company detached to Tactical Group "Comiso-Ispica")
 CXXVI Motorized Artillery Group (75/27 field guns, 2nd Battery detached to Mobile Group "F")
 LIV Engineer Battalion
 54th Anti-tank Company (47/32 anti-tank guns)
 Division Services

 German XIV Panzer Corps 
The XIV Panzer Corps was activated 18 July 1943 to take command of the 15th Panzergrenadier Division, the Hermann Göring Division, the newly arrived 1st Parachute Division and the 29th Panzergrenadier Division which started to arrive in Sicily on 18 July. The commanding general was General der Panzertruppe Hans-Valentin Hube.
 German XIV Panzer Corps, General der Panzertruppe Hans-Valentin Hube
 382nd Panzergrenadier Regiment (reinforcements, arrived 11 July)
 2x battalions (a third battalion remained in Naples)
 904th Fortress Battalion
 923rd Fortress Battalion
 926th Fortress Battalion
 4th Battery/ I Battalion/ 71st Werfer Regiment (15 cm Nebelwerfer 41 and 21 cm Nebelwerfer 42)
 Panzer Division "Hermann Göring" - Generalleutnant Paul Conrath (attached to XVI Italian Army Corps until the activation of XIV Panzer Corps on 18 July)
 Panzer Regiment "Hermann Göring"
 2x tank battalions, 1x assault gun battalion (43x Panzer III L/M, 7x Panzer III K 3x Panzer III N, 32x Panzer IV F2/G, 20x StuG IIIG, 9x StuH 42)
 1st Panzergrenadier Regiment "Hermann Göring"
 3x battalions
 2nd Panzergrenadier Regiment "Hermann Göring"
 3x battalions
 Panzer Artillery Regiment "Hermann Göring"
 I Battalion (3x 10.5 cm leFH 18 batteries)
 II Battalion (2x 10.5 cm leFH 18 and 1x 10 cm sK 18 batteries)
 III Battalion (2x 15 cm sFH 18 and 1x 10 cm sK 18 batteries)
 Anti-aircraft Regiment "Hermann Göring"
 I Battalion (3x 8.8 cm Flak and 2x 2 cm Flak batteries)
 II Battalion (3x 8.8 cm Flak and 4x 2 cm Flak batteries; reinforcements arriving 30 July)
 Panzer Reconnaissance Battalion "Hermann Göring"
 Panzer Engineer Battalion "Hermann Göring"
 Panzer Signal Battalion "Hermann Göring"
 Replacement Battalion "Hermann Göring"
 2nd Company/ 504th Heavy Tank Battalion (17x Tiger I)
 Division Services
 15th Panzergrenadier Division - Generalmajor Eberhard Rodt (one third of the division (a reinforced infantry group) was attached to the XVI Italian Army Corps and the rest to the XII Italian Army Corps until the activation of XIV Panzer Corps on 18 July)
 104th Panzergrenadier Regiment
 2x battalions
 115th Panzergrenadier Regiment
 2x battalions
 129th Panzergrenadier Regiment
 3x battalions
 33rd Motorized Artillery Regiment
 I Battalion (3x 10.5 cm leFH 18 batteries)
 II Battalion (3x 17 cm Kanone 18 batteries; former 557th Heavy Artillery Battalion)
 III Battalion (2x 10.5 cm leFH 18 and 1x mortar batteries)
 IV Battalion (3x 10.5 cm leFH 18 batteries)
 Panzergrenadier Battalion "Reggio", in Reggio Calabria
 215th Panzer Battalion (6x Panzer III, 46x Panzer IV)
 33rd Engineer Battalion
 315th Anti-aircraft Battalion (2x 8.8 cm Flak, 1x 3.7 cm Flak and 1x 2 cm Flak batteries)
 999th Signal Battalion
 Division Services
 1st Fallschirmjäger Division - Generalleutnant Richard Heidrich (commenced arriving by air on 12 July; the 1st Fallschirmjäger Regiment was held in reserve at Naples)
 3rd Fallschirmjäger Regiment
 3x battalions
 13th Mortar Company
 14th Anti-tank Company
 4th Fallschirmjäger Regiment
 3x battalions
 13th Mortar Company
 14th Anti-tank Company
 1st Parachute Artillery Regiment
 I Battalion (3x batteries 7.5 cm GebG 36)
 II Battalion (3x batteries 7.5 cm GebG 36; with the 1st Fallschirmjäger Regiment at Naples)
 1st Parachute Machine Gun Battalion
 1st Parachute Panzerjäger Battalion (7.5 cm Pak 40 anti-tank guns)
 1st Parachute Engineer Battalion
 1st Parachute Signal Battalion
 Division Services
 29th Panzergrenadier Division - Generalmajor Walter Fries (commenced arriving in Sicily on 18 July)
 15th Panzergrenadier Regiment
 3x battalions
 13th Mortar Company (6x sIG Grille)
 14th Anti-tank Company (3x 7.5 cm Pak 40, 6x 5 cm Pak 38)
 71st Panzergrenadier Regiment
 3x battalions
 13th Company (6x sIG Grille)
 14th Anti-tank Company (3x 7.5 cm Pak 40, 6x 5 cm Pak 38)
 29th Artillery Regiment
 I Self-propelled Battalion (18x le.F.H. Wespe)
 II Battalion
 III Battalion
 129th Panzer Battalion (43x StuG III, 3x Panzer III K)
 129th Panzer Reconnaissance Battalion (remained in Southern Italy)
 29th Engineer Battalion
 313th Anti-aircraft Battalion (2x 8.8 cm Flak and 1x 3.7 cm Flak batteries)
 29th Signal Battalion
 Division Services

 Territorial Defense Command Palermo 
The Territorial Defense Command was tasked with rear area security duties, the training of recruits, and the formation of units.
 Territorial Defense Command Palermo, in Palermo
 25th Military Zone, in Palermo
 Infantry Complementary Officer Recruits School
 185th Coastal Regiment (activated on 20 May 1943)
 186th Coastal Regiment (activated on 1 June 1943 - not fully mobilized)
 188th Coastal Regiment (activated on 15 June 1943 - not fully mobilized)
 189th Coastal Regiment (activated on 15 June 1943 - not fully mobilized)
 Territorial Carabinieri Legion "Palermo"
 13th CC.NN. Railway Legion (rail transport police)
 22nd CC.NN. Anti-aircraft Legion
 See Territorial Anti-aircraft Defense section for details 5th CC.NN. Road Units Group (traffic police)
 I CC.NN. Forestry Battalion (forest/environmental police)
 CCCLXVIII Mobile Territorial CC.NN. Battalion
 CCCLXX Territorial CC.NN. Battalion
 CCCLXXI Territorial CC.NN. Battalion
 CCCLXXII Territorial CC.NN. Battalion
 58th, 59th, 67th, 68th, 72nd, 73rd, and 74th Coastal CC.NN. companies
 4x Coastal artillery batteries
 28th Infantry Division "Aosta" Depot, in Palermo
 54th Infantry Division "Napoli" Depot, in Caltanissetta
 26th Military Zone, in Messina
 Territorial Carabinieri Legion "Messina"
 DLXVII Mobile Territorial CC.NN. Battalion
 CCCLXXIII Territorial CC.NN. Battalion
 75th Coastal CC.NN. Company
 29th Infantry Division "Piemonte" Depot, in Messina

The 29th Infantry Division "Piemonte" was one of three infantry divisions, which recruited in Sicily. It mainly drafted men from eastern Sicily and had its peacetime headquarters in Messina. It's two infantry regiments were based in Messina (3rd) and Catania (4th), with the division's artillery regiment based also in Messina. In September 1940 the division was transferred to Albania and remained in the Balkans and Greece until it disbanded after the Italian-Allied Armistice of Cassibile.

 Maritime Military Command Sicily 
Military harbors in Sicily were under command of the Royal Italian Navy's Maritime Military Command Sicily in Messina, which fell under Armed Forces Command Sicily. The command's commanding officer was Ammiraglio di Squadra Pietro Barone and a large majority of its units were Royal Italian Army and CC.NN. units. The only naval units in Sicily in July 1943 were twenty torpedo boats of the 3rd and 7th torpedo boat squadrons.

Besides the three major commands listed below the Royal Italian Navy was also present with administrative Navy Commands in Catania, Palermo, and Porto Empedocle.

 Maritime Military Base Messina-Reggio Calabria 
 Maritime Military Base Messina-Reggio Calabria, in Messina - Ammiraglio di Squadra Pietro Barone
 116th Coastal Regiment, in Reggio Calabria
 CLVI Coastal Battalion
 DII Coastal Battalion
 119th Coastal Regiment
 CCCLXX Coastal Battalion
 CCCLXXI Coastal Battalion
 CDXLII Coastal Battalion
 DIII Coastal Battalion
 95th CC.NN. Legion "Marzocco"
 XCIII CC.NN. Battalion
 XCV CC.NN. Battalion
 93rd CC.NN. Machine Gun Company
 DLXIII Mobile Territorial CC.NN. Battalion (from the 163rd CC.NN. Legion "Tommaso Gulli" in Reggio Calabria)
 DLXVI Mobile Territorial CC.NN. Battalion
 XIII Dismounted Squadrons Group/ Regiment "Cavalleggeri di Palermo"
 CCLV Coastal Artillery Battalion, in Reggio Calabria (100/22 howitzers)
 CLVIII Coastal Artillery Battalion (149/19 heavy guns)

 6th CC.NN. Maritime Artillery Legion 
 6th CC.NN. Maritime Artillery Legion, in Messina
 50th, 51st, 52nd, 53rd, 54th, and 55th Coastal CC.NN. companies
 Sicilian Command Group North, in Fort Menaja
 Coastal Artillery Battery "Masotto" (6x 280/9 coastal defense howitzers)
 Coastal Artillery Battery "Spartà" (3x 152/45 naval guns and 1x 120/40 naval gun)
 Coastal Artillery Battery "Mezzacapo" (4x 120/50 naval guns)
 Artillery Battery "RE 198" (4x 105/28 field guns; Royal Italian Army)
 Searchlights at Pace del Mela and Torre Faro; optical telegraph at Fort Spuria; reconnaissance station at Piano del Giglio
 Anti-aircraft Command Group North, at Tremonti
 Dual-role Battery "MS 123" (4x 90/42 naval/anti-aircraft guns)
 Dual-role Battery "MS 400" (4x 76/40 naval/anti-aircraft guns)
 Anti-aircraft Battery "MS 475" (4x 90/53 anti-aircraft guns)
 Anti-aircraft Battery "MS 577" (4x 76/40 anti-aircraft guns)
 Anti-aircraft Battery "MS 724" (4x 90/53 anti-aircraft guns)
 Anti-aircraft Battery "MS 949" (4x 90/53 anti-aircraft guns)
 Sicilian Command Group South, in Puntale Cappellaro
 Coastal Artillery Battery "Cavalli" (6x 280/9 coastal defense howitzers)
 Coastal Artillery Battery "Margottini" (3x 152/45 naval guns and 1x 120/40 naval gun)
 Coastal Artillery Battery "De Cristofaro" (4x 120/40 naval guns)
 Artillery Battery "RE 199" (4x 105/28 field guns; Royal Italian Army)
 Searchlight at Tremestieri
 Anti-aircraft Command Group South, at Montepiselli
 Dual-role Battery "MS 3" (4x 76/40 naval/anti-aircraft guns)
 Dual-role Battery "MS 280" (4x 90/53 naval/anti-aircraft guns)
 Dual-role Battery "MS 525" (4x 90/42 naval/anti-aircraft guns)
 Dual-role Battery "MS 611" (4x 76/40 naval/anti-aircraft guns)

After the allies had landed on Sicily the Maritime Military Base Messina-Reggio Calabria was reinforced with every available anti-aircraft battery to protect the vital supply route over the Strait of Messina. Until the end of July the following anti-aircraft units had reached Messina:
 Anti-aircraft Battery "MS 120" (4x 90/53 anti-aircraft guns)
 Dual-role Battery "MS 159" (4x 90/42 naval/anti-aircraft guns)
 Anti-aircraft Battery "MS 253" (4x 76/40 anti-aircraft guns)
 Anti-aircraft Battery "MS 277" (4x 90/53 anti-aircraft guns)
 Anti-aircraft Battery "MS 328" (4x 90/53 anti-aircraft guns)
 Anti-aircraft Battery "RE 344" (8x 37/54 anti-aircraft guns; Royal Italian Army)
 Anti-aircraft Battery "MS 349" (4x 90/53 anti-aircraft guns)
 Anti-aircraft Battery "MS 434" (4x 90/53 anti-aircraft guns)
 Anti-aircraft Battery "MS 477" (4x 76/40 anti-aircraft guns)
 Anti-aircraft Battery "MS 553" (8x 37/54 anti-aircraft guns)
 Dual-role Battery "MS 620" (4x 90/53 naval/anti-aircraft guns)
 Dual-role Battery "MS 713" (4x 76/40 naval/anti-aircraft guns)
 Anti-aircraft Battery "MS 807" (4x 90/53 anti-aircraft guns)
 Anti-aircraft Battery "MS 881" (4x 90/53 anti-aircraft guns)
 Anti-aircraft Battery "MS 905" (4x 76/40 anti-aircraft guns)
 Anti-aircraft Battery "MS 940" (4x 90/53 anti-aircraft guns)

Additionally the German Army's 281st Flak Battalion had been transferred to Messina with eight 8.8 cm Flak and six smaller caliber anti-aircraft batteries. After arriving in Messina the 281st Battalion was renamed "Flak Subgroup Messina". Retreating Italian army troops brought a further three 75/46 and six 90/53 anti-aircraft batteries to Messina. On 2 August the retreating 22nd Flak Brigade of the Luftwaffe arrived in Messina and took command of all Axis air-defense units.

 14th CC.NN. Maritime Artillery Legion 
 14th CC.NN. Maritime Artillery Legion, in Reggio Calabria
 Calabrian Command Group North, at Fort Siacci
 Coastal Artillery Battery "Beleno" (6x 280/9 coastal defense howitzers)
 Artillery Battery "RE 196" (4x 105/28 field guns; Royal Italian Army)
 Searchlights at Scilla, Santa Trada, and Punta Pezzo
 Calabrian Command Group South, in Pentimele Sud
 Coastal Artillery Battery "Pellizzari" (4x 280/9 coastal defense howitzers)
 Coastal Artillery Battery "Conteduca" (4x 152/50 and 1x 120/40 naval guns)
 Artillery Battery "RE 197" (4x 105/28 field guns; Royal Italian Army)
 Searchlights at Catona and Pentimele; reconnaissance Station at Torre Lupo
 Anti-aircraft Command Group Reggio Calabria:
 Dual-role Battery "MS 110" (4x 90/42 naval/anti-aircraft guns)
 Anti-aircraft Battery "MS 116" (4x 90/53 anti-aircraft guns)
 Dual-role Battery "MS 268" (4x 90/53 naval/anti-aircraft guns)
 Anti-aircraft Battery "MS 374" (4x 76/40 anti-aircraft guns)
 Anti-aircraft Battery "MS 430" (4x 90/53 anti-aircraft guns)
 Dual-role Battery "MS 643" (4x 90/53 naval/anti-aircraft guns)
 Dual-role Battery "MS 819" (4x 90/53 naval/anti-aircraft guns)

Additionally the Luftwaffe's 182nd Heavy Flak Battalion had been transferred to Reggio Calabria with eight 8.8 cm Flak, four 10.5 cm Flak, and five smaller caliber anti-aircraft batteries. After arriving in Reggio Calabria the 182nd Battalion was renamed "Flak Subgroup Reggio-San Giovanni". The Germans also deployed four 17 cm cannon batteries as mobile coastal batteries on the Calabrian side of the strait. On 2 August the retreating 22nd Flak Brigade of the Luftwaffe arrived in Messina and took command of all Axis air-defense units.

 Maritime Military Sector Augusta-Syracuse 

The Maritime Military Sector Augusta-Syracuse was responsible for the harbors of Augusta and Syracuse, and the coast between Arenella (206th Coastal Division) to the South and Punta Castelluccio in Agnone Bagni (213th Coastal Division) to the North.
 Maritime Military Sector Augusta-Syracuse, in Augusta - Ammiraglio di Divisione Priamo Leonardi
 121st Coastal Regiment
 CCXLVI Coastal Battalion, in Augusta
 CCCLXXXV Coastal Battalion, in Syracuse
 DIV Coastal Battalion, between Augusta and Melilli
 DXL Coastal Battalion, between Belvedere and Grottone
 80th Artillery Battery
 5x Blockposts
 CCCLXIX Territorial CC.NN. Battalion
 I Protection Battalion (Royal Italian Air Force unit at Seaplane Base Syracuse)
 1x Royal Italian Navy battalion
 5x Anti-paratrooper units

 7th CC.NN. Maritime Artillery Legion 
 7th CC.NN. Maritime Artillery Legion
 60th, and 63rd Coastal CC.NN. companies
 Augusta Sector
 Coastal Artillery Battery "Luigi di Savoia" (2x 203/50 naval guns)
 Coastal Artillery Battery "Biagio Assereto" (3x 152/50 and 1x 120/40 naval guns)
 Coastal Artillery Battery "Bozzo Gravina"(3x 152/50 and 1x 120/40 naval guns)
 Floating Battery "GM 216" (2x 190/45 naval guns, 2x 20/70 anti-aircraft guns)
 Floating battery "GM 239"(2x 149/47 and 1x 76/40 naval guns, 2x 20/70 anti-aircraft guns)
 Dual-role Battery "AS 269" (6x 102/35 naval/anti-aircraft guns)
 Dual-role Battery "AS 360" (6x 76/40 naval/anti-aircraft guns)
 Dual-role Battery "AS 361" (6x 102/35 naval/anti-aircraft guns)
 Dual-role Battery "AS 362" (6x 102/35 naval/anti-aircraft guns)
 Dual-role Battery "AS 363" (6x 76/40 naval/anti-aircraft guns)
 Anti-aircraft Battery "AS 364" (6x 76/40 anti-aircraft guns)
 Dual-role Battery "AS 383" (6x 102/35 naval/anti-aircraft guns)
 Anti-aircraft Battery "AS 416" (6x 76/40 anti-aircraft guns)
 Dual-role Battery "AS 561" (6x 102/35 naval/anti-aircraft guns)
 Anti-aircraft Battery "AS 592" (6x 102/35 anti-aircraft guns)
 Anti-aircraft Battery "AS 674" (6x 76/40 anti-aircraft guns)
 Dual-role Battery "AS 741" (6x 76/40 naval/anti-aircraft guns)
 Dual-role Battery "AS 896" (6x 76/40 naval/anti-aircraft guns)
 Autonomous Group "Siracusa", in Syracuse
 Coastal Artillery Battery "Opera A" (2x 381/40 naval guns)
 Coastal Artillery Battery "Emanuele Russo"(3x 152/50 and 1x 120/40 naval guns)
 Coastal Artillery Battery "Lamba Doria"(3x 152/50 and 1x 120/40 naval guns)
 Dual-role Battery "AS 309" (6x 76/40 naval/anti-aircraft guns)
 Dual-role Battery "AS 365" (6x 76/40 naval/anti-aircraft guns)
 Dual-role Battery "AS 493" (6x 102/35 naval/anti-aircraft guns)
 Dual-role Battery "AS 671" (6x 76/40 naval/anti-aircraft guns)
 Dual-role Battery "AS 909" (6x 76/40 naval/anti-aircraft guns)

 Maritime Military Sector Trapani 
 Maritime Military Sector Trapani, in Trapani - Rear Admiral Giuseppe Manfredi
 137th Coastal Regiment
 CDXLIII Coastal Battalion
 DV Coastal Battalion
 DCCCXLIV Coastal Battalion
 CCCLXXIV Territorial CC.NN. Battalion
 8th CC.NN. Maritime Artillery Legion
 9x Anti-ship artillery batteries (Royal Italian Navy)
 76th, 77th, 78th, 79th, 80th, 81st, and 82nd Coastal CC.NN. companies
 Anti-aircraft Command Group Trapani:
 3x Anti-aircraft batteries (102/35 anti-aircraft guns; Royal Italian Navy)
 1x Anti-aircraft battery (90/53 anti-aircraft guns; Royal Italian Navy)
 5x Anti-aircraft batteries (76/40 anti-aircraft guns; Royal Italian Navy)
 1x Anti-aircraft battery (102/35 anti-aircraft guns; CC.NN.)
 2x Anti-aircraft batteries (90/53 anti-aircraft guns; CC.NN.)
 3x Anti-aircraft batteries (76/40 anti-aircraft guns; CC.NN.)

 Armored Trains 
The Royal Italian Navy fielded 14 armored trains, which were equipped with naval guns that had been removed from decommissioned ships. Ten of the trains were assigned to the Armed Forces Command Sicily before the allied landings, with eight trains being transferred to Sicily and two based on the Italian mainland near Reggio Calabria to provide fire for the defense of the Strait of Messina. The ten trains of the Armed Forces Command Sicily on 10 July 1943 were:

 Type 1 Operational Train (4x 120/45 Mod. 1918 naval guns, 4x 20/77 anti-aircraft guns)
 Armored Train 120/1/S, in Siderno (attached to the 211th Coastal Division in Calabria)
 Armored Train 120/3/S, in Porto Empedocle (attached to the 207th Coastal Division)
 Armored Train 120/4/S, in Catania (attached to the 213th Coastal Division)
 Type 2 Operational Train (4x 152/40 naval guns, 4x 20/77 anti-aircraft guns)
 Armored Train 152/1/T, in Termini Imerese (attached to the 208th Coastal Division)
 Armored Train 152/2/T, in Carini (attached to the 208th Coastal Division)
 Armored Train 152/3/T, in Crotone (attached to the 212th Coastal Division in Calabria)
 Type 3 Operational Train (6x 76/40 Mod. 1916 naval guns, 4x 20/77 anti-aircraft guns)
 Armored Train 76/1/T, in Porto Empedocle (attached to the 207th Coastal Division)
 Type 3-bis Operational Train (4x 76/40 Mod. 1916 naval guns, 4x 20/77 anti-aircraft guns)
 Armored Train 76/2/T, in Licata (attached to the 207th Coastal Division)
 Armored Train 76/3/T, in Mazara del Vallo (attached to the 202nd Coastal Division)
 Type 4 Operational Train (6x 102/35 Mod. 1914 naval guns, 4x 20/77 anti-aircraft guns)
 Armored Train 102/1/T, in Syracuse (attached to the 206th Coastal Division)

The ten armored trains did not take part in any combat operation after the allied landings in Sicily, as the allies' absolute air supremacy prevent the trains from leaving their camouflaged shelters. The eight trains based in Sicily were blown up by their crews during the retreat from the island.

 Air Force Command Sicily 
Airfields in Sicily were under command of the Royal Italian Air Force's Air Force Command Sicily, which fell under Armed Forces Command Sicily. The commanding officer was Generale di divisione aerea Adriano Monti.

Each airfield was garrisoned by two infantry companies, reinforced by two mortar squads with 81mm Mod. 35 mortars, and two artillery batteries with 149/12 howitzers.

The airfields and units under command of Air Force Command Sicily on 10 July 1943, and the reinforcements, which arrived in Sicily on 10 and 11 July 1943, were:
 Augusta Airfield
 8th Naval Reconnaissance Squadron (Z.506 Airone and RS.14 float planes)
 170th and 186th flights (197th Flight detached to Stagnone Airfield)
 Castelvetrano Airfield
 16th Fighter Squadron (C.202 Folgore fighters)
 167th, 168th, and 169th flights
 Staff Schlachtgeschwader 2
 I/Schlachtgeschwader 2, at Milis Airfield in Sardinia (Fw 190 F-2 fighters)
 II/Schlachtgeschwader 2 (Fw 190 F-2 fighters)
 Chinisia Airfield
 21st Fighter Squadron (C.202 Folgore fighters)
 356th, 361st, and 386th flights
 155th Fighter Squadron (C.205 Veltro fighters; arrived from Monserrato Airfield)
 351st and 360th flights (378th Flight remained at Monserrato)
 Comiso Airfield
 3rd Fighter Squadron (Bf.109G fighters)
 153rd, 154th, and 155th flights
 Staff Jagdgeschwader 53
 I/Jagdgeschwader 53, at Vibo Valentia Airfield (Bf-109 G6 fighters)
 II/Jagdgeschwader 53, at Gerbini Airfield (Bf-109 G6 fighters)
 III/Jagdgeschwader 53, at Sigonella Airfield (Bf-109 G6 fighters)
 II/Nachtjagdgeschwader 2 Ju-88C6
 III/Schnellkampfgeschwader 10, at Comiso Airfield (Fw 190 A-5 fighters)
 Gerbini Airfield
 131st Torpedo-Bomber Squadron (SM.79 Sparviero torpedo-bombers)
 279th and 284th flights
 Staff Schnellkampfgeschwader 10
 II/Schnellkampfgeschwader 10 (Fw 190 A-5 fighters)
 III/Schnellkampfgeschwader 10, at Comiso Airfield (Fw 190 A-5 fighters)
 IV/Schnellkampfgeschwader 10 (Fw 190 A-5 fighters)
 II/Jagdgeschwader 53 (Bf-109 G6 fighters)
 Palermo-Boccadifalco Airfield
 66th Reconnaissance Squadron (Ca.311, Ca.313, and Ca.314 reconnaissance/attack planes)
 131st Flight (87th Flight detached to Sigonella Airfield)
 153rd Fighter Squadron (C.202 Folgore fighters)
 372nd, 373rd, 374th, and 377th flights
 46th Assault Squadron (CR.42 Falco fighters; arrived from Capoterra Airfield)
 20th Flight
 47th Assault Squadron (CR.42 Falco fighters; arrived from Oristano Airfield)
 53rd Flight
 207th Flight/ 103rd Dive-Bomber Squadron (Ju.87D Stuka dive bombers; arrived from Decimomannu Airfield)
 Elements of the 3rd Fighter Wing with C.202 Folgore fighter arrived from Cerveteri Airfield near Rome on 11 July
 Reggio Calabria Airfield (located just over the Messina Strait on mainland Italy)
 161st Fighter Squadron (C.200 Saetta, Dewoitine D.520, and C.202 Folgore fighters)
 162nd, 164th, and 371st flights
 Stagnone Airfield
 197th Flight/ 8th Naval Reconnaissance Squadron
 Sciacca Airfield
 150th Fighter Squadron (Bf.109G fighters)
 363rd, 364th, and 365th flights
 Staff Jagdgeschwader 77
 I/Jagdgeschwader 77 (Bf-109 G6 fighters)
 2.(F)/Aufklärungsgruppe 122 (Ju 88 A and Me 410 Hornisse planes)
 Catania-Sigonella Airfield
 4th Fighter Wing
 9th Fighter Squadron (C.202 Folgore and C.205 Veltro fighters)
 73rd, 96th, and 97th flights
 10th Fighter Squadron (C.202 Folgore and C.205 Veltro fighters)
 84th, 90th, and 91st flights
 22nd Fighter Squadron (Re.2001 Falco II and Re.2005 Sagittario fighters; arrived from Naples-Capodichino Airfield)
 362nd and 369th flights
 87th Flight/ 66th Reconnaissance Squadron
 III/Jagdgeschwader 53 (Bf-109 G6 fighters)

Airfields without flying units:
 Finocchiara Airfield
 Milazzo Airfield
 Milo Airfield

 3rd Air Fleet 
Bombers and torpedo-bombers of 3rd Air Fleet entered combat in support of Air Force Command Sicily starting from 10 July 1943.
 3rd Air Fleet
 Bomber Group, at Perugia Airfield
 28th Bomber Squadron, at Perugia Airfield (Z.1007 Alcione bombers)
 10th and 19th flights
 29th Bomber Squadron, at Viterbo Airfield (Ju 88 A bombers)
 62nd and 63rd flights
 51st Bomber Squadron, at Viterbo Airfield (Ju 88 A Alcione bombers)
 212th and 213th flights
 86th Bomber Squadron, at Perugia Airfield (Z.1007 Alcione bombers)
 190th and 191st flights
 88th Bomber Squadron, at Perugia Airfield (Z.1007 Alcione bombers)
 264th and 265th flights
 106th Bomber Squadron, at Perugia Airfield (Z.1007 Alcione bombers)
 260th and 261st flights
 Torpedo-Bomber Group
 41st Torpedo-Bomber Squadron, at Siena Airfield (SM.79 Sparviero Sparviero torpedo-bombers)
 204th and 205th flights
 89th Torpedo-Bomber Squadron, at Siena Airfield (SM.79 Sparviero torpedo-bombers)
 228th and 229th flights
 104th Torpedo-Bomber Squadron, at Siena Airfield (SM.79 Sparviero torpedo-bombers)
 252nd and 253rd flights
 108th Torpedo-Bomber Squadron, at Pisa Airfield (SM.79 Sparviero torpedo-bombers)
 256th and 257th flights
 130th Torpedo-Bomber Squadron, at Littoria Airfield (SM.79 Sparviero torpedo-bombers)
 280th and 283rd flights
 132nd Torpedo-Bomber Squadron, at Littoria Airfield (SM.79 Sparviero torpedo-bombers)
 278th and 281st flights
 274th Long Range Bomber Flight, at Guidonia Airfield (P.108 heavy bombers)

 4th Air Fleet 
Aircraft of the 4th Air Fleet based in Southern Italy entered combat in support of Air Force Command Sicily from 10 July 1943. At the same date reinforcements from other air fleets began to arrive in Southern Italy to reinforce 4th Air Fleet.
 Crotone Airfield
 97th Interceptor Squadron (Ro.57 fighters)
 226th and 227th flights
 102nd Dive-Bomber Squadron (Re.2002 Ariete fighter-bombers; arrived from Tarquinia Airfield)
 209th and 239th flights
 158th Assault Squadron (G.50 Freccia fighters; arrived from Osoppo Airfield)
 elements of 236th, 387th, and 388th flights
 159th Assault Squadron (G.50 Freccia fighters; arrived from Pistoia Airfield)
 389th, 390th, and 391st flights
 Gioia del Colle Airfield
 98th Bomber Squadron (SM.84 bombers; arrived from Lonate Pozzolo Airfield)
 240th and 241st flights
 121st Dive-Bomber Squadron (Ju.87D Stuka dive bombers; arrived from Lonate Pozzolo Airfield)
 206th and 216th flights
 237th Flight/ 103rd Dive-Bomber Squadron (Ju.87D Stuka dive bombers; arrived from Decimomannu Airfield)
 Grottaglie Airfield
 157th Fighter Squadron (C.200 Saetta fighters)
 163rd, 357th, 371st, and 384th flights
 Lecce Airfield
 IV/Jagdgeschwader 4, (Bf-109 G6)
 Manduria Airfield
 8th Bomber Wing
 27th Bomber Squadron (Z.1007 Alcione bombers)
 18th and 52nd flights
 101st Dive-Bomber Squadron (Re.2002 Ariete fighter-bombers; arrived from Lonate Pozzolo Airfield)
 208th and 238th flights
 Montecorvino Airfield
 II/Zerstörer-Geschwader 1 (Me-110 G2)
 Vibo Valentia Airfield
 I/Jagdgeschwader 53, (Bf-109 G6)
 II/Jagdgeschwader 27, (Bf-10 9G6)

 Territorial Anti-aircraft Defense 
The Territorial Anti-aircraft Defense ( - MDICAT) was an organization of the Italian National Fascist Party's Voluntary Militia for National Security tasked with static air-defense of cities and installations. The MDICAT was organized in 22 legions, which commanded all ground-based air-defense units, including Royal Italian Army and Royal Italian Navy units, in their sector. The territorial anti-aircraft defense unit responsible for Sicily was the 22nd Territorial CC.NN. Anti-aircraft Legion. The list below gives an overview of the 22nd Legion's batteries sorted by cities with the respective services army (RA), navy (RN), and militia (CC.NN.) listed.

The anti-aircraft batteries in Messina, Reggio Calabria, Augusta, and Trapani were detached to the Royal Italian Navy's maritime military commands in these cities.
 Territorial Anti-aircraft Defense - 22nd Territorial CC.NN. Anti-aircraft Legion, in Palermo
 Ionia
 2x Anti-aircraft batteries (90/53 anti-aircraft guns; RA)
 2x Anti-aircraft batteries (20/65 anti-aircraft guns; RA)
 Gerbini Airfield
 1x Anti-aircraft battery (37/54 anti-aircraft guns; RA)
 1x Anti-aircraft battery (37/54 anti-aircraft guns; CC.NN.)
 2x Anti-aircraft batteries (76/40 anti-aircraft guns; RA)
 Catania
 460th Anti-aircraft Battery (90/53 anti-aircraft guns; CC.NN.)
 483rd Anti-aircraft Battery (76/40 anti-aircraft guns; RN)
 813th Anti-aircraft Battery (20/65 anti-aircraft guns; CC.NN.)
 2x Anti-aircraft batteries (37/54 anti-aircraft guns; RA)
 2x Anti-aircraft batteries (75/46 anti-aircraft guns; RA)
 5x Anti-aircraft batteries (90/53 anti-aircraft guns; CC.NN.)
 6x Anti-aircraft batteries (76/40 anti-aircraft guns; CC.NN.)
 2x Anti-aircraft batteries (37/54 anti-aircraft guns; CC.NN.)
 2x Anti-aircraft batteries (20/65 anti-aircraft guns; CC.NN.)
 San Pietro Clarenza
 XXXI Anti-aircraft Group
 18th and 19th Anti-aircraft batteries (76/40 anti-aircraft guns; CC.NN.)
 232nd and 827th Anti-aircraft batteries (20/65 anti-aircraft guns; CC.NN.)
 Gela
 22nd Anti-aircraft Battery (76/40 anti-aircraft guns; CC.NN.)
 23rd Anti-aircraft Battery (76/40 anti-aircraft guns; CC.NN.)
 93rd Anti-aircraft Battery (76/40 anti-aircraft guns; CC.NN.)
 333rd Anti-aircraft Battery (37/54 anti-aircraft guns; RA)
 334th Anti-aircraft Battery (37/54 anti-aircraft guns; RA)
 523rd Anti-aircraft Battery (37/54 anti-aircraft guns; RA)
 796th Anti-aircraft Battery (20/65 anti-aircraft guns; RA)
 1x Anti-aircraft battery (20/65 anti-aircraft guns; RA)
 Licata
 675th Anti-aircraft Battery (76/40 anti-aircraft guns; RN)
 791st Anti-aircraft Battery (20/65 anti-aircraft guns; CC.NN.)
 Porto Empedocle
 LXXVII Anti-aircraft Group
 644th, 645th, 646th, and 669th batteries (90/53 anti-aircraft guns; CC.NN.)
 1x Anti-aircraft battery (76/40 anti-aircraft guns; RN)
 1x Anti-aircraft battery (20/65 anti-aircraft guns; CC.NN.)
 1x Anti-aircraft battery (37/54 anti-aircraft guns; RA)
 Sciacca
 816th Anti-aircraft Battery (20/65 anti-aircraft guns; CC.NN.)
 1x Anti-aircraft battery (90/53 anti-aircraft guns; CC.NN.)
 3x Anti-aircraft batteries (76/40 anti-aircraft guns; CC.NN.)
 1x Anti-aircraft battery (37/54 anti-aircraft guns; RA)
 1x Anti-aircraft battery (20/65 anti-aircraft guns; CC.NN.)
 Castelvetrano
 LXXXIII Anti-aircraft Group, at Castelvetrano
 629th and 653rd Anti-aircraft batteries (90/53 anti-aircraft guns; CC.NN.)
 795th Anti-aircraft Battery (20/65 anti-aircraft guns; CC.NN.)
 XC Anti-aircraft Group, at Castelvetrano Airfield
 668th and 676th Anti-aircraft batteries (90/53 anti-aircraft guns; CC.NN.)
 814th Anti-aircraft Battery (20/65 anti-aircraft guns; CC.NN.)
 3x Anti-aircraft batteries (75/27 anti-aircraft guns; RA)
 4x Anti-aircraft batteries (37/54 anti-aircraft guns; RA)
 2x Anti-aircraft batteries (76/40 anti-aircraft guns; CC.NN.)
 2x Anti-aircraft batteries (75/46 anti-aircraft guns; CC.NN.)
 Marsala
 476th Anti-aircraft Battery (90/53 anti-aircraft guns; CC.NN.)
 2x Anti-aircraft batteries (90/53 anti-aircraft guns; CC.NN.)
 2x Anti-aircraft batteries (20/65 anti-aircraft guns; CC.NN.)
 Chinisia Airfield
 LIX Anti-aircraft Group
 31st Anti-aircraft Battery (76/40 anti-aircraft guns; CC.NN.)
 2x Anti-aircraft batteries (76/40 anti-aircraft guns; CC.NN.)
 3x Anti-aircraft batteries (37/54 anti-aircraft guns; RA)
 1x Anti-aircraft battery (90/53 anti-aircraft guns; CC.NN.)
 Palermo
 411th Anti-aircraft Battery (102/35 anti-aircraft guns; CC.NN.)
 414th Anti-aircraft Battery (76/40 anti-aircraft guns; CC.NN.)
 415th Anti-aircraft Battery (76/40 anti-aircraft guns; CC.NN.)
 418th Anti-aircraft Battery (76/40 anti-aircraft guns; CC.NN.)
 630th Anti-aircraft Battery (90/53 anti-aircraft guns; CC.NN.)
 733rd Anti-aircraft Battery (20/65 anti-aircraft guns; RA)
 1x Anti-aircraft battery (20/65 anti-aircraft guns; RA)
 2x Anti-aircraft batteries (102/35 anti-aircraft guns; CC.NN.)
 6x Anti-aircraft batteries (90/53 anti-aircraft guns; CC.NN.)
 5x Anti-aircraft batteries (76/40 anti-aircraft guns; CC.NN.)
 4x Anti-aircraft batteries (37/54 anti-aircraft guns; CC.NN.)
 3x Anti-aircraft batteries (20/65 anti-aircraft guns; CC.NN.)
 Termini Imerese
 468th Anti-aircraft Battery (90/53 anti-aircraft guns; RA)
 3x Anti-aircraft batteries (90/53 anti-aircraft guns; RA)
 1x Anti-aircraft battery (20/65 anti-aircraft guns; RA)
 Milazzo
 1x Anti-aircraft battery (75/46 anti-aircraft guns; CC.NN.)
 2x Anti-aircraft batteries (75/27 anti-aircraft guns; RA)
 1x Anti-aircraft battery (20/65 anti-aircraft guns; CC.NN.)

There were also single CC.NN. batteries at Portopalo di Capo Passero, Motta Sant'Anastasia, Vizzini, Pozzallo, Vittoria, Punta Secca, and Costa Raia, and two batteries at Cassibile and two at Lercara Friddi. The Royal Italian Army had single batteries at Pachino, Acireale, Ragusa, and Roccapalumba.

Other batteries deployed in Sicily in July 1943, whose location on the island is unknown, are listed below:
 20/65 anti-aircraft guns:
 59th, 284th, 792nd, 793rd, 815th, 837th, and 1506th batteries
 75/27 anti-aircraft guns:
 8th, 29th, 133rd, 331st, and 452nd batteries
 75/46 anti-aircraft guns:
 524th Battery
 76/40 anti-aircraft guns:
 625th and 648th batteries
 8.8 cm Flak anti-aircraft guns:
 1399th, 1405th, 1408th, 1415th, 1418th, and 1429th batteries
 Batteries with unknown equipment:
 342nd, 345th, 413th, 417th, 504th, 650th, 908th batteries

 Voluntary Militia for National Security 
The Voluntary Militia for National Security ( - MVSN) was the Italian National Fascist Party's paramilitary wing. The MVSN had police functions and provided the regime with readily available paramilitary units for internal oppression. During WWII the MVSN raised military units, which were operationally assigned to Royal Italian Army or Royal Italian Navy commands. The MVSN's command authority in Sicily was the 14th Zone and its legions, the units they raised for the defense of Sicily, and the commands these units were assigned to are listed below.
 14th Zone, in Palermo
 166th CC.NN. Legion "Peloro", in Messina (29th Infantry Division "Piemonte")
 CLXVI (1939) (29th Infantry Division "Piemonte")
 DLXVI Mobile Territorial CC.NN. Battalion (Maritime Military Base Messina-Reggio Calabria)
 50th, 51st, 52nd, 53rd, 54th, and 55th Coastal CC.NN. companies (6th CC.NN. Maritime Artillery Legion)
 167th CC.NN. Legion "Etna", in Catania
 CLXVII (1939) (166th CC.NN. Legion "Peloro"/ 29th Infantry Division "Piemonte")
 DLXVII Mobile Territorial CC.NN. Battalion (26th Military Zone)
 168th CC.NN. Legion "Hyblae", in Ragusa
 CLXVIII CC.NN. Battalion (171st CC.NN. Legion "Vespri"/ 28th Infantry Division "Aosta")
 CCCLXVIII Mobile Territorial CC.NN. Battalion (25th Military Zone)
 58th and 59th Coastal CC.NN. companies (25th Military Zone)
 169th CC.NN. Legion "Tirreno", in Syracuse
 CLXIX CC.NN. Battalion (173rd CC.NN. Legion "Salso"/ 54th Infantry Division "Napoli")
 CCCLXIX Territorial CC.NN. Battalion (Maritime Military Sector Augusta-Syracuse)
 60th and 63rd Coastal CC.NN. companies (7th CC.NN. Maritime Artillery Legion)
 170th CC.NN. Legion "Agrigentum", in Agrigento
 CCCLXX Territorial CC.NN. Battalion (25th Military Zone)
 67th and 68th Coastal CC.NN. companies (25th Military Zone)
 171st CC.NN. Legion "Vespri", in Palermo (28th Infantry Division "Aosta")
 CLXXI CC.NN. Battalion (28th Infantry Division "Aosta")
 CCCLXXI Territorial CC.NN. Battalion (25th Military Zone)
 172nd CC.NN. Legion "Enna", in Enna
 CCCLXXII Territorial CC.NN. Battalion (25th Military Zone)
 72nd, 73rd, and 74th Coastal CC.NN. companies (25th Military Zone)
 173rd CC.NN. Legion "Salso", in Caltanissetta (54th Infantry Division "Napoli")
 CLXXIII CC.NN. Battalion (54th Infantry Division "Napoli")
 CCCLXXIII Territorial CC.NN. Battalion (26th Military Zone)
 75th Coastal CC.NN. Company (26th Military Zone)
 174th CC.NN. Legion "Segesta", in Trapani
 CCCLXXIV Coastal CC.NN. Battalion (Maritime Military Sector Trapani)
 76th and 82nd Coastal CC.NN. companies (Maritime Military Sector Trapani)

 Messina Evacuation 
During Operation Lehrgang - the Axis evacuation from Sicily - the German evacuation efforts were under command of Seetransportführer Messina'' (Sea-transport-leader Messina) Kapitän zur See Gustav Freiherr von Liebenstein, while the Italian evacuation was organized by Ammiraglio di Squadra Pietro Barone. The Italians pressed every possible ship into service and used four evacuation routes across the Strait of Messina, while the Germans had brought three landing flotillas to Messina for the evacuation.
 2. Landungs-Division - Seetransportführer Messina - Kapitän zur See Gustav Freiherr von Liebenstein
 2. Landungs-Flottille (2nd Landing Flotilla)
 29x Marinefährprahm and other boats; Marinefährprahms F 147, F 466, F 146, F 432, F 460, F 546, F 434, F 618, and F 435 were lost during the evacuation of Sicily
 4. Landungs-Flottille (4th Landing Flotilla)
 31x Marinefährprahm and 12 other boats; Marinefährprahms F 466, F 432, F 460, F 430, F 429, F 462, F 607, and F 437 were lost during the evacuation of Sicily
 10. Landungs-Flottille (10th Landing Flotilla)
 9x Siebel ferries and infantry transport boats
 Pionier-Landungs-Bataillon 771 (771st Engineer Landing Battalion; Army Unit)
 6x Marinefährprahm, 14x landing boats, 465 meter of landing bridges, and a number of Storm boats

See also
 Operation Husky

Notes
Footnotes

Citations

References
 Juno Beach Centre - Canadian Army units in Sicily
 
 
 

 
 
 

World War II orders of battle
Husky order of battle
Husky order of battle
Allied invasion of Sicily